Lepidoptera of Croatia consist of both the butterflies and moths recorded from Croatia.

Butterflies

Hesperiidae
Carcharodus alceae (Esper, 1780)
Carcharodus floccifera (Zeller, 1847)
Carcharodus lavatherae (Esper, 1783)
Carcharodus orientalis Reverdin, 1913
Carterocephalus palaemon (Pallas, 1771)
Erynnis tages (Linnaeus, 1758)
Gegenes nostrodamus (Fabricius, 1793)
Gegenes pumilio (Hoffmannsegg, 1804)
Hesperia comma (Linnaeus, 1758)
Heteropterus morpheus (Pallas, 1771)
Ochlodes sylvanus (Esper, 1777)
Pyrgus alveus (Hübner, 1803)
Pyrgus armoricanus (Oberthur, 1910)
Pyrgus carthami (Hübner, 1813)
Pyrgus malvae (Linnaeus, 1758)
Pyrgus onopordi (Rambur, 1839)
Pyrgus serratulae (Rambur, 1839)
Pyrgus sidae (Esper, 1784)
Spialia orbifer (Hübner, 1823)
Spialia sertorius (Hoffmannsegg, 1804)
Thymelicus acteon (Rottemburg, 1775)
Thymelicus lineola (Ochsenheimer, 1808)
Thymelicus sylvestris (Poda, 1761)

Lycaenidae
Agriades dardanus (Freyer, 1845)
Aricia agestis (Denis & Schiffermuller, 1775)
Aricia anteros (Freyer, 1838)
Aricia artaxerxes (Fabricius, 1793)
Callophrys rubi (Linnaeus, 1758)
Celastrina argiolus (Linnaeus, 1758)
Cupido minimus (Fuessly, 1775)
Cupido osiris (Meigen, 1829)
Cupido alcetas (Hoffmannsegg, 1804)
Cupido argiades (Pallas, 1771)
Cupido decolorata (Staudinger, 1886)
Cyaniris semiargus (Rottemburg, 1775)
Eumedonia eumedon (Esper, 1780)
Favonius quercus (Linnaeus, 1758)
Glaucopsyche alexis (Poda, 1761)
Iolana iolas (Ochsenheimer, 1816)
Lampides boeticus (Linnaeus, 1767)
Leptotes pirithous (Linnaeus, 1767)
Lycaena alciphron (Rottemburg, 1775)
Lycaena candens (Herrich-Schäffer, 1844)
Lycaena dispar (Haworth, 1802)
Lycaena hippothoe (Linnaeus, 1761)
Lycaena phlaeas (Linnaeus, 1761)
Lycaena thersamon (Esper, 1784)
Lycaena tityrus (Poda, 1761)
Lycaena virgaureae (Linnaeus, 1758)
Lysandra bellargus (Rottemburg, 1775)
Lysandra coridon (Poda, 1761)
Phengaris alcon (Denis & Schiffermuller, 1775)
Phengaris arion (Linnaeus, 1758)
Phengaris nausithous (Bergstrasser, 1779)
Phengaris teleius (Bergstrasser, 1779)
Plebejus argus (Linnaeus, 1758)
Plebejus argyrognomon (Bergstrasser, 1779)
Plebejus idas (Linnaeus, 1761)
Polyommatus admetus (Esper, 1783)
Polyommatus daphnis (Denis & Schiffermuller, 1775)
Polyommatus amandus (Schneider, 1792)
Polyommatus dorylas (Denis & Schiffermuller, 1775)
Polyommatus eros (Ochsenheimer, 1808)
Polyommatus escheri (Hübner, 1823)
Polyommatus icarus (Rottemburg, 1775)
Polyommatus thersites (Cantener, 1835)
Pseudophilotes vicrama (Moore, 1865)
Satyrium acaciae (Fabricius, 1787)
Satyrium ilicis (Esper, 1779)
Satyrium pruni (Linnaeus, 1758)
Satyrium spini (Denis & Schiffermuller, 1775)
Satyrium w-album (Knoch, 1782)
Scolitantides orion (Pallas, 1771)
Tarucus balkanica (Freyer, 1844)
Thecla betulae (Linnaeus, 1758)

Nymphalidae
Aglais io (Linnaeus, 1758)
Aglais urticae (Linnaeus, 1758)
Apatura ilia (Denis & Schiffermuller, 1775)
Apatura iris (Linnaeus, 1758)
Aphantopus hyperantus (Linnaeus, 1758)
Araschnia levana (Linnaeus, 1758)
Arethusana arethusa (Denis & Schiffermuller, 1775)
Argynnis paphia (Linnaeus, 1758)
Argynnis pandora (Denis & Schiffermuller, 1775)
Boloria dia (Linnaeus, 1767)
Boloria euphrosyne (Linnaeus, 1758)
Boloria selene (Denis & Schiffermuller, 1775)
Boloria titania (Esper, 1793)
Brenthis daphne (Bergstrasser, 1780)
Brenthis hecate (Denis & Schiffermuller, 1775)
Brenthis ino (Rottemburg, 1775)
Brintesia circe (Fabricius, 1775)
Charaxes jasius (Linnaeus, 1767)
Chazara briseis (Linnaeus, 1764)
Coenonympha arcania (Linnaeus, 1761)
Coenonympha glycerion (Borkhausen, 1788)
Coenonympha oedippus (Fabricius, 1787)
Coenonympha pamphilus (Linnaeus, 1758)
Coenonympha rhodopensis Elwes, 1900
Erebia aethiops (Esper, 1777)
Erebia epiphron (Knoch, 1783)
Erebia euryale (Esper, 1805)
Erebia gorge (Hübner, 1804)
Erebia ligea (Linnaeus, 1758)
Erebia medusa (Denis & Schiffermuller, 1775)
Erebia melas (Herbst, 1796)
Erebia oeme (Hübner, 1804)
Erebia ottomana Herrich-Schäffer, 1847
Erebia pronoe (Esper, 1780)
Erebia stirius (Godart, 1824)
Euphydryas aurinia (Rottemburg, 1775)
Euphydryas maturna (Linnaeus, 1758)
Fabriciana adippe (Denis & Schiffermuller, 1775)
Fabriciana niobe (Linnaeus, 1758)
Hipparchia fagi (Scopoli, 1763)
Hipparchia syriaca (Staudinger, 1871)
Hipparchia statilinus (Hufnagel, 1766)
Hipparchia semele (Linnaeus, 1758)
Hyponephele lupinus (O. Costa, 1836)
Hyponephele lycaon (Rottemburg, 1775)
Issoria lathonia (Linnaeus, 1758)
Kirinia roxelana (Cramer, 1777)
Lasiommata maera (Linnaeus, 1758)
Lasiommata megera (Linnaeus, 1767)
Libythea celtis (Laicharting, 1782)
Limenitis camilla (Linnaeus, 1764)
Limenitis populi (Linnaeus, 1758)
Limenitis reducta Staudinger, 1901
Lopinga achine (Scopoli, 1763)
Maniola jurtina (Linnaeus, 1758)
Melanargia galathea (Linnaeus, 1758)
Melanargia larissa (Geyer, 1828)
Melitaea athalia (Rottemburg, 1775)
Melitaea aurelia Nickerl, 1850
Melitaea britomartis Assmann, 1847
Melitaea cinxia (Linnaeus, 1758)
Melitaea diamina (Lang, 1789)
Melitaea didyma (Esper, 1778)
Melitaea phoebe (Denis & Schiffermuller, 1775)
Melitaea telona Fruhstorfer, 1908
Minois dryas (Scopoli, 1763)
Neptis rivularis (Scopoli, 1763)
Neptis sappho (Pallas, 1771)
Nymphalis antiopa (Linnaeus, 1758)
Nymphalis polychloros (Linnaeus, 1758)
Nymphalis vaualbum (Denis & Schiffermuller, 1775)
Nymphalis xanthomelas (Esper, 1781)
Pararge aegeria (Linnaeus, 1758)
Polygonia c-album (Linnaeus, 1758)
Polygonia egea (Cramer, 1775)
Proterebia afra (Fabricius, 1787)
Pyronia cecilia (Vallantin, 1894)
Pyronia tithonus (Linnaeus, 1767)
Satyrus ferula (Fabricius, 1793)
Speyeria aglaja (Linnaeus, 1758)
Vanessa atalanta (Linnaeus, 1758)
Vanessa cardui (Linnaeus, 1758)

Papilionidae
Iphiclides podalirius (Linnaeus, 1758)
Papilio alexanor Esper, 1800
Papilio machaon Linnaeus, 1758
Parnassius apollo (Linnaeus, 1758)
Parnassius mnemosyne (Linnaeus, 1758)
Zerynthia polyxena (Denis & Schiffermuller, 1775)

Pieridae
Anthocharis cardamines (Linnaeus, 1758)
Aporia crataegi (Linnaeus, 1758)
Colias alfacariensis Ribbe, 1905
Colias croceus (Fourcroy, 1785)
Colias hyale (Linnaeus, 1758)
Colias myrmidone (Esper, 1781)
Euchloe ausonia (Hübner, 1804)
Gonepteryx cleopatra (Linnaeus, 1767)
Gonepteryx rhamni (Linnaeus, 1758)
Leptidea morsei (Fenton, 1882)
Leptidea sinapis (Linnaeus, 1758)
Pieris balcana Lorkovic, 1970
Pieris brassicae (Linnaeus, 1758)
Pieris ergane (Geyer, 1828)
Pieris mannii (Mayer, 1851)
Pieris napi (Linnaeus, 1758)
Pieris rapae (Linnaeus, 1758)
Pontia edusa (Fabricius, 1777)

Riodinidae
Hamearis lucina (Linnaeus, 1758)

Moths

Adelidae
Adela croesella (Scopoli, 1763)
Adela cuprella (Denis & Schiffermuller, 1775)
Adela reaumurella (Linnaeus, 1758)
Cauchas fibulella (Denis & Schiffermuller, 1775)
Cauchas leucocerella (Scopoli, 1763)
Cauchas rufifrontella (Treitschke, 1833)
Cauchas rufimitrella (Scopoli, 1763)
Nematopogon adansoniella (Villers, 1789)
Nematopogon pilella (Denis & Schiffermuller, 1775)
Nematopogon robertella (Clerck, 1759)
Nematopogon swammerdamella (Linnaeus, 1758)
Nemophora barbatellus (Zeller, 1847)
Nemophora cupriacella (Hübner, 1819)
Nemophora degeerella (Linnaeus, 1758)
Nemophora istrianellus (Heydenreich, 1851)
Nemophora metallica (Poda, 1761)
Nemophora minimella (Denis & Schiffermuller, 1775)
Nemophora pfeifferella (Hübner, 1813)

Alucitidae
Alucita bidentata Scholz & Jackh, 1994
Alucita cancellata (Meyrick, 1908)
Alucita cymatodactyla Zeller, 1852
Alucita grammodactyla Zeller, 1841
Alucita huebneri Wallengren, 1859
Alucita major (Rebel, 1906)
Alucita zonodactyla Zeller, 1847
Pterotopteryx dodecadactyla Hübner, 1813

Argyresthiidae
Argyresthia abdominalis Zeller, 1839
Argyresthia bonnetella (Linnaeus, 1758)
Argyresthia fundella (Fischer von Röslerstamm, 1835)
Argyresthia goedartella (Linnaeus, 1758)
Argyresthia prenjella Rebel, 1901
Argyresthia pruniella (Clerck, 1759)
Argyresthia semifusca (Haworth, 1828)
Argyresthia semitestacella (Curtis, 1833)
Argyresthia sorbiella (Treitschke, 1833)
Argyresthia spinosella Stainton, 1849
Argyresthia arceuthina Zeller, 1839
Argyresthia illuminatella Zeller, 1839

Autostichidae
Apatema apolausticum Gozmany, 1996
Aprominta designatella (Herrich-Schäffer, 1855)
Dysspastus undecimpunctella (Mann, 1864)
Holcopogon bubulcellus (Staudinger, 1859)
Nukusa cinerella (Rebel, 1941)
Nukusa praeditella (Rebel, 1891)
Oegoconia caradjai Popescu-Gorj & Capuse, 1965
Oegoconia huemeri Sutter, 2007
Oegoconia novimundi (Busck, 1915)
Pantacordis pales Gozmany, 1954
Symmoca albicanella Zeller, 1868
Symmoca signatella Herrich-Schäffer, 1854
Symmoca signella (Hübner, 1796)

Bedelliidae
Bedellia ehikella Szocs, 1967
Bedellia somnulentella (Zeller, 1847)

Blastobasidae
Blastobasis huemeri Sinev, 1993
Blastobasis phycidella (Zeller, 1839)
Xenopathia novaki (Rebel, 1891)

Brachodidae
Brachodes compar (Staudinger, 1879)
Brachodes nana (Treitschke, 1834)

Brahmaeidae
Lemonia balcanica (Herrich-Schäffer, 1847)
Lemonia dumi (Linnaeus, 1761)
Lemonia taraxaci (Denis & Schiffermuller, 1775)

Bucculatricidae
Bucculatrix albedinella (Zeller, 1839)
Bucculatrix albella Stainton, 1867
Bucculatrix bechsteinella (Bechstein & Scharfenberg, 1805)
Bucculatrix cidarella (Zeller, 1839)
Bucculatrix demaryella (Duponchel, 1840)
Bucculatrix frangutella (Goeze, 1783)
Bucculatrix helichrysella Constant, 1889
Bucculatrix herbalbella Chretien, 1915
Bucculatrix infans Staudinger, 1880
Bucculatrix nigricomella (Zeller, 1839)
Bucculatrix thoracella (Thunberg, 1794)
Bucculatrix ulmella Zeller, 1848
Bucculatrix ulmifoliae M. Hering, 1931
Bucculatrix zizyphella Chretien, 1907

Carposinidae
Carposina berberidella Herrich-Schäffer, 1854

Chimabachidae
Dasystoma salicella (Hübner, 1796)
Diurnea fagella (Denis & Schiffermuller, 1775)

Choreutidae
Anthophila fabriciana (Linnaeus, 1767)
Choreutis nemorana (Hübner, 1799)
Choreutis pariana (Clerck, 1759)
Prochoreutis myllerana (Fabricius, 1794)
Tebenna bjerkandrella (Thunberg, 1784)
Tebenna micalis (Mann, 1857)
Tebenna pretiosana (Duponchel, 1842)

Cimeliidae
Axia margarita (Hübner, 1813)

Coleophoridae
Coleophora acrisella Milliere, 1872
Coleophora adelogrammella Zeller, 1849
Coleophora adspersella Benander, 1939
Coleophora albella (Thunberg, 1788)
Coleophora albicostella (Duponchel, 1842)
Coleophora albitarsella Zeller, 1849
Coleophora alcyonipennella (Kollar, 1832)
Coleophora aleramica Baldizzone & Stubner, 2007
Coleophora alticolella Zeller, 1849
Coleophora anatipenella (Hübner, 1796)
Coleophora angustiorella Fuchs, 1903
Coleophora argentula (Stephens, 1834)
Coleophora astragalella Zeller, 1849
Coleophora auricella (Fabricius, 1794)
Coleophora badiipennella (Duponchel, 1843)
Coleophora bilineatella Zeller, 1849
Coleophora caespititiella Zeller, 1839
Coleophora calycotomella Stainton, 1869
Coleophora cecidophorella Oudejans, 1972
Coleophora chamaedriella Bruand, 1852
Coleophora colutella (Fabricius, 1794)
Coleophora conspicuella Zeller, 1849
Coleophora conyzae Zeller, 1868
Coleophora coracipennella (Hübner, 1796)
Coleophora coronillae Zeller, 1849
Coleophora currucipennella Zeller, 1839
Coleophora deauratella Lienig & Zeller, 1846
Coleophora dianthi Herrich-Schäffer, 1855
Coleophora directella Zeller, 1849
Coleophora ditella Zeller, 1849
Coleophora drymidis Mann, 1857
Coleophora flaviella Mann, 1857
Coleophora flavipennella (Duponchel, 1843)
Coleophora follicularis (Vallot, 1802)
Coleophora frankii Schmidt, 1886
Coleophora galbulipennella Zeller, 1838
Coleophora gardesanella Toll, 1954
Coleophora glaucicolella Wood, 1892
Coleophora graminicolella Heinemann, 1876
Coleophora gryphipennella (Hübner, 1796)
Coleophora halophilella Zimmermann, 1926
Coleophora hartigi Toll, 1944
Coleophora helichrysiella Krone, 1909
Coleophora hemerobiella (Scopoli, 1763)
Coleophora hieronella Zeller, 1849
Coleophora ibipennella Zeller, 1849
Coleophora insulicola Toll, 1942
Coleophora inulae Wocke, 1877
Coleophora kuehnella (Goeze, 1783)
Coleophora laricella (Hübner, 1817)
Coleophora lessinica Baldizzone, 1980
Coleophora limosipennella (Duponchel, 1843)
Coleophora lineolea (Haworth, 1828)
Coleophora linosyridella Fuchs, 1880
Coleophora lithargyrinella Zeller, 1849
Coleophora lixella Zeller, 1849
Coleophora lutipennella (Zeller, 1838)
Coleophora macedonica Toll, 1959
Coleophora maritimella Newman, 1863
Coleophora mayrella (Hübner, 1813)
Coleophora medelichensis Krone, 1908
Coleophora meridionella Rebel, 1912
Coleophora milvipennis Zeller, 1839
Coleophora niveicostella Zeller, 1839
Coleophora nutantella Muhlig & Frey, 1857
Coleophora obtectella Zeller, 1849
Coleophora obviella Rebel, 1914
Coleophora ochrea (Haworth, 1828)
Coleophora onobrychiella Zeller, 1849
Coleophora ononidella Milliere, 1879
Coleophora oriolella Zeller, 1849
Coleophora ornatipennella (Hübner, 1796)
Coleophora otidipennella (Hübner, 1817)
Coleophora paripennella Zeller, 1839
Coleophora partitella Zeller, 1849
Coleophora pennella (Denis & Schiffermuller, 1775)
Coleophora preisseckeri Toll, 1942
Coleophora prunifoliae Doets, 1944
Coleophora pseudociconiella Toll, 1952
Coleophora pseudolinosyris Kasy, 1979
Coleophora pseudorepentis Toll, 1960
Coleophora ptarmicia Walsingham, 1910
Coleophora pyrrhulipennella Zeller, 1839
Coleophora quadristraminella Toll, 1961
Coleophora salicorniae Heinemann & Wocke, 1877
Coleophora saponariella Heeger, 1848
Coleophora saxicolella (Duponchel, 1843)
Coleophora serpylletorum Hering, 1889
Coleophora serratella (Linnaeus, 1761)
Coleophora silenella Herrich-Schäffer, 1855
Coleophora soffneriella Toll, 1961
Coleophora spinella (Schrank, 1802)
Coleophora spumosella Staudinger, 1859
Coleophora squalorella Zeller, 1849
Coleophora squamella Constant, 1885
Coleophora sternipennella (Zetterstedt, 1839)
Coleophora striolatella Zeller, 1849
Coleophora taeniipennella Herrich-Schäffer, 1855
Coleophora tamesis Waters, 1929
Coleophora tauricella Staudinger, 1880
Coleophora therinella Tengstrom, 1848
Coleophora thurneri Glaser, 1969
Coleophora trifariella Zeller, 1849
Coleophora trifolii (Curtis, 1832)
Coleophora trigeminella Fuchs, 1881
Coleophora trochilella (Duponchel, 1843)
Coleophora tyrrhaenica Amsel, 1951
Coleophora uralensis Toll, 1961
Coleophora valesianella Zeller, 1849
Coleophora variicornis Toll, 1952
Coleophora versurella Zeller, 1849
Coleophora vestianella (Linnaeus, 1758)
Coleophora vibicella (Hübner, 1813)
Coleophora vibicigerella Zeller, 1839
Coleophora vicinella Zeller, 1849
Coleophora vulnerariae Zeller, 1839
Coleophora wockeella Zeller, 1849
Coleophora zelleriella Heinemann, 1854
Goniodoma nemesi Capuse, 1970

Cosmopterigidae
Cosmopterix coryphaea Walsingham, 1908
Cosmopterix orichalcea Stainton, 1861
Cosmopterix pulchrimella Chambers, 1875
Cosmopterix scribaiella Zeller, 1850
Cosmopterix zieglerella (Hübner, 1810)
Eteobalea albiapicella (Duponchel, 1843)
Eteobalea anonymella (Riedl, 1965)
Eteobalea dohrnii (Zeller, 1847)
Eteobalea intermediella (Riedl, 1966)
Eteobalea isabellella (O. G. Costa, 1836)
Eteobalea serratella (Treitschke, 1833)
Eteobalea sumptuosella (Lederer, 1855)
Eteobalea tririvella (Staudinger, 1870)
Hodgesiella rebeli (Krone, 1905)
Limnaecia phragmitella Stainton, 1851
Pancalia leuwenhoekella (Linnaeus, 1761)
Pancalia nodosella (Bruand, 1851)
Pancalia schwarzella (Fabricius, 1798)
Pyroderces argyrogrammos (Zeller, 1847)
Pyroderces caesaris Gozmany, 1957
Sorhagenia janiszewskae Riedl, 1962
Sorhagenia lophyrella (Douglas, 1846)
Sorhagenia rhamniella (Zeller, 1839)
Vulcaniella cognatella Riedl, 1990
Vulcaniella extremella (Wocke, 1871)
Vulcaniella fiordalisa (Petry, 1904)
Vulcaniella grabowiella (Staudinger, 1859)
Vulcaniella pomposella (Zeller, 1839)

Cossidae
Cossus cossus (Linnaeus, 1758)
Dyspessa ulula (Borkhausen, 1790)
Parahypopta caestrum (Hübner, 1808)
Phragmataecia castaneae (Hübner, 1790)
Zeuzera pyrina (Linnaeus, 1761)

Crambidae
Achyra nudalis (Hübner, 1796)
Agriphila brioniellus (Zerny, 1914)
Agriphila dalmatinellus (Hampson, 1900)
Agriphila geniculea (Haworth, 1811)
Agriphila inquinatella (Denis & Schiffermuller, 1775)
Agriphila latistria (Haworth, 1811)
Agriphila paleatellus (Zeller, 1847)
Agriphila poliellus (Treitschke, 1832)
Agriphila selasella (Hübner, 1813)
Agriphila straminella (Denis & Schiffermuller, 1775)
Agriphila tersellus (Lederer, 1855)
Agriphila tristella (Denis & Schiffermuller, 1775)
Agrotera nemoralis (Scopoli, 1763)
Anania coronata (Hufnagel, 1767)
Anania crocealis (Hübner, 1796)
Anania funebris (Strom, 1768)
Anania fuscalis (Denis & Schiffermuller, 1775)
Anania hortulata (Linnaeus, 1758)
Anania lancealis (Denis & Schiffermuller, 1775)
Anania luctualis (Hübner, 1793)
Anania perlucidalis (Hübner, 1809)
Anania stachydalis (Germar, 1821)
Anania terrealis (Treitschke, 1829)
Anania testacealis (Zeller, 1847)
Anania verbascalis (Denis & Schiffermuller, 1775)
Anarpia incertalis (Duponchel, 1832)
Ancylolomia palpella (Denis & Schiffermuller, 1775)
Ancylolomia pectinatellus (Zeller, 1847)
Ancylolomia tentaculella (Hübner, 1796)
Antigastra catalaunalis (Duponchel, 1833)
Aporodes floralis (Hübner, 1809)
Atralata albofascialis (Treitschke, 1829)
Calamotropha paludella (Hübner, 1824)
Cataclysta lemnata (Linnaeus, 1758)
Catoptria acutangulellus (Herrich-Schäffer, 1847)
Catoptria falsella (Denis & Schiffermuller, 1775)
Catoptria languidellus (Zeller, 1863)
Catoptria lythargyrella (Hübner, 1796)
Catoptria margaritella (Denis & Schiffermuller, 1775)
Catoptria myella (Hübner, 1796)
Catoptria mytilella (Hübner, 1805)
Catoptria petrificella (Hübner, 1796)
Catoptria pinella (Linnaeus, 1758)
Catoptria verellus (Zincken, 1817)
Chilo phragmitella (Hübner, 1805)
Cholius luteolaris (Scopoli, 1772)
Chrysocrambus craterella (Scopoli, 1763)
Chrysocrambus linetella (Fabricius, 1781)
Chrysoteuchia culmella (Linnaeus, 1758)
Cornifrons ulceratalis Lederer, 1858
Crambus lathoniellus (Zincken, 1817)
Crambus pascuella (Linnaeus, 1758)
Crambus perlella (Scopoli, 1763)
Crambus pratella (Linnaeus, 1758)
Crambus silvella (Hübner, 1813)
Cybalomia lutosalis (Mann, 1862)
Cynaeda dentalis (Denis & Schiffermuller, 1775)
Cynaeda gigantea (Wocke, 1871)
Diasemia reticularis (Linnaeus, 1761)
Diasemiopsis ramburialis (Duponchel, 1834)
Dolicharthria bruguieralis (Duponchel, 1833)
Dolicharthria punctalis (Denis & Schiffermuller, 1775)
Dolicharthria stigmosalis (Herrich-Schäffer, 1848)
Donacaula forficella (Thunberg, 1794)
Donacaula mucronella (Denis & Schiffermuller, 1775)
Duponchelia fovealis Zeller, 1847
Ecpyrrhorrhoe diffusalis (Guenee, 1854)
Ecpyrrhorrhoe rubiginalis (Hübner, 1796)
Elophila nymphaeata (Linnaeus, 1758)
Elophila rivulalis (Duponchel, 1834)
Euchromius bella (Hübner, 1796)
Euchromius cambridgei (Zeller, 1867)
Euchromius ocellea (Haworth, 1811)
Euchromius ramburiellus (Duponchel, 1836)
Euchromius superbellus (Zeller, 1849)
Eudonia angustea (Curtis, 1827)
Eudonia delunella (Stainton, 1849)
Eudonia lacustrata (Panzer, 1804)
Eudonia mercurella (Linnaeus, 1758)
Eudonia phaeoleuca (Zeller, 1846)
Eudonia truncicolella (Stainton, 1849)
Eudonia vallesialis (Duponchel, 1832)
Eurrhypis guttulalis (Herrich-Schäffer, 1848)
Eurrhypis pollinalis (Denis & Schiffermuller, 1775)
Evergestis aenealis (Denis & Schiffermuller, 1775)
Evergestis caesialis (Herrich-Schäffer, 1849)
Evergestis extimalis (Scopoli, 1763)
Evergestis forficalis (Linnaeus, 1758)
Evergestis frumentalis (Linnaeus, 1761)
Evergestis isatidalis (Duponchel, 1833)
Evergestis limbata (Linnaeus, 1767)
Evergestis pallidata (Hufnagel, 1767)
Evergestis politalis (Denis & Schiffermuller, 1775)
Evergestis sophialis (Fabricius, 1787)
Heliothela wulfeniana (Scopoli, 1763)
Hellula undalis (Fabricius, 1781)
Hodebertia testalis (Fabricius, 1794)
Hydriris ornatalis (Duponchel, 1832)
Hyperlais argillacealis (Zeller, 1847)
Hyperlais dulcinalis (Treitschke, 1835)
Loxostege aeruginalis (Hübner, 1796)
Loxostege clathralis (Hübner, 1813)
Loxostege comptalis (Freyer, 1848)
Loxostege deliblatica Szent-Ivany & Uhrik-Meszaros, 1942
Loxostege fascialis (Hübner, 1796)
Loxostege sticticalis (Linnaeus, 1761)
Loxostege turbidalis (Treitschke, 1829)
Loxostege virescalis (Guenee, 1854)
Mecyna asinalis (Hübner, 1819)
Mecyna flavalis (Denis & Schiffermuller, 1775)
Mecyna trinalis (Denis & Schiffermuller, 1775)
Mesocrambus candiellus (Herrich-Schäffer, 1848)
Metacrambus carectellus (Zeller, 1847)
Metasia carnealis (Treitschke, 1829)
Metasia corsicalis (Duponchel, 1833)
Metasia ophialis (Treitschke, 1829)
Metasia suppandalis (Hübner, 1823)
Nomophila noctuella (Denis & Schiffermuller, 1775)
Nymphula nitidulata (Hufnagel, 1767)
Ostrinia nubilalis (Hübner, 1796)
Palpita vitrealis (Rossi, 1794)
Paracorsia repandalis (Denis & Schiffermuller, 1775)
Parapoynx stratiotata (Linnaeus, 1758)
Paratalanta hyalinalis (Hübner, 1796)
Paratalanta pandalis (Hübner, 1825)
Pediasia aridella (Thunberg, 1788)
Pediasia contaminella (Hübner, 1796)
Pediasia fascelinella (Hübner, 1813)
Pediasia jucundellus (Herrich-Schäffer, 1847)
Pediasia luteella (Denis & Schiffermuller, 1775)
Pediasia siculellus (Duponchel, 1836)
Platytes alpinella (Hübner, 1813)
Platytes cerussella (Denis & Schiffermuller, 1775)
Pleuroptya balteata (Fabricius, 1798)
Pleuroptya ruralis (Scopoli, 1763)
Psammotis pulveralis (Hübner, 1796)
Pyrausta aurata (Scopoli, 1763)
Pyrausta castalis Treitschke, 1829
Pyrausta cingulata (Linnaeus, 1758)
Pyrausta coracinalis Leraut, 1982
Pyrausta despicata (Scopoli, 1763)
Pyrausta nigrata (Scopoli, 1763)
Pyrausta obfuscata (Scopoli, 1763)
Pyrausta ostrinalis (Hübner, 1796)
Pyrausta purpuralis (Linnaeus, 1758)
Pyrausta sanguinalis (Linnaeus, 1767)
Pyrausta virginalis Duponchel, 1832
Scirpophaga praelata (Scopoli, 1763)
Sclerocona acutella (Eversmann, 1842)
Scoparia ambigualis (Treitschke, 1829)
Scoparia basistrigalis Knaggs, 1866
Scoparia ingratella (Zeller, 1846)
Scoparia manifestella (Herrich-Schäffer, 1848)
Scoparia perplexella (Zeller, 1839)
Scoparia pyralella (Denis & Schiffermuller, 1775)
Scoparia subfusca Haworth, 1811
Sitochroa palealis (Denis & Schiffermuller, 1775)
Sitochroa verticalis (Linnaeus, 1758)
Talis quercella (Denis & Schiffermuller, 1775)
Tegostoma comparalis (Hübner, 1796)
Thisanotia chrysonuchella (Scopoli, 1763)
Titanio normalis (Hübner, 1796)
Udea ferrugalis (Hübner, 1796)
Udea fimbriatralis (Duponchel, 1834)
Udea fulvalis (Hübner, 1809)
Udea languidalis (Eversmann, 1842)
Udea nebulalis (Hübner, 1796)
Udea numeralis (Hübner, 1796)
Udea olivalis (Denis & Schiffermuller, 1775)
Udea prunalis (Denis & Schiffermuller, 1775)
Uresiphita gilvata (Fabricius, 1794)
Xanthocrambus lucellus (Herrich-Schäffer, 1848)
Xanthocrambus saxonellus (Zincken, 1821)

Douglasiidae
Klimeschia transversella (Zeller, 1839)
Tinagma balteolella (Fischer von Röslerstamm, 1841)
Tinagma perdicella Zeller, 1839

Drepanidae
Asphalia ruficollis (Denis & Schiffermuller, 1775)
Cilix glaucata (Scopoli, 1763)
Cymatophorina diluta (Denis & Schiffermuller, 1775)
Drepana falcataria (Linnaeus, 1758)
Habrosyne pyritoides (Hufnagel, 1766)
Polyploca ridens (Fabricius, 1787)
Tethea ocularis (Linnaeus, 1767)
Tethea or (Denis & Schiffermuller, 1775)
Thyatira batis (Linnaeus, 1758)
Watsonalla binaria (Hufnagel, 1767)
Watsonalla cultraria (Fabricius, 1775)
Watsonalla uncinula (Borkhausen, 1790)

Elachistidae
Agonopterix adspersella (Kollar, 1832)
Agonopterix alstromeriana (Clerck, 1759)
Agonopterix arenella (Denis & Schiffermuller, 1775)
Agonopterix assimilella (Treitschke, 1832)
Agonopterix atomella (Denis & Schiffermuller, 1775)
Agonopterix capreolella (Zeller, 1839)
Agonopterix crassiventrella (Rebel, 1891)
Agonopterix doronicella (Wocke, 1849)
Agonopterix furvella (Treitschke, 1832)
Agonopterix irrorata (Staudinger, 1870)
Agonopterix kaekeritziana (Linnaeus, 1767)
Agonopterix laterella (Denis & Schiffermuller, 1775)
Agonopterix nanatella (Stainton, 1849)
Agonopterix nervosa (Haworth, 1811)
Agonopterix parilella (Treitschke, 1835)
Agonopterix purpurea (Haworth, 1811)
Agonopterix rutana (Fabricius, 1794)
Agonopterix selini (Heinemann, 1870)
Agonopterix squamosa (Mann, 1864)
Anchinia daphnella (Denis & Schiffermuller, 1775)
Blastodacna atra (Haworth, 1828)
Blastodacna hellerella (Duponchel, 1838)
Cacochroa permixtella (Herrich-Schäffer, 1854)
Depressaria cervicella Herrich-Schäffer, 1854
Depressaria douglasella Stainton, 1849
Depressaria marcella Rebel, 1901
Depressaria tenebricosa Zeller, 1854
Depressaria veneficella Zeller, 1847
Depressaria hirtipalpis Zeller, 1854
Depressaria dictamnella (Treitschke, 1835)
Dystebenna stephensi (Stainton, 1849)
Elachista argentella (Clerck, 1759)
Elachista catalana Parenti, 1978
Elachista chrysodesmella Zeller, 1850
Elachista constitella Frey, 1859
Elachista graeca Parenti, 2002
Elachista metella Kaila, 2002
Elachista revinctella Zeller, 1850
Elachista vegliae Parenti, 1978
Elachista biatomella (Stainton, 1848)
Elachista occidentalis Frey, 1882
Ethmia chrysopyga (Zeller, 1844)
Exaeretia lutosella (Herrich-Schäffer, 1854)
Haplochrois ochraceella (Rebel, 1903)
Heinemannia festivella (Denis & Schiffermuller, 1775)
Hypercallia citrinalis (Scopoli, 1763)
Luquetia lobella (Denis & Schiffermuller, 1775)
Orophia denisella (Denis & Schiffermuller, 1775)
Orophia ferrugella (Denis & Schiffermuller, 1775)
Orophia sordidella (Hübner, 1796)
Orophia zernyi (Szent-Ivany, 1942)
Perittia huemeri (Traugott-Olsen, 1990)
Semioscopis steinkellneriana (Denis & Schiffermuller, 1775)
Spuleria flavicaput (Haworth, 1828)

Endromidae
Endromis versicolora (Linnaeus, 1758)

Epermeniidae
Epermenia aequidentellus (E. Hofmann, 1867)
Epermenia chaerophyllella (Goeze, 1783)
Epermenia illigerella (Hübner, 1813)
Epermenia insecurella (Stainton, 1854)
Epermenia petrusellus (Heylaerts, 1883)
Epermenia strictellus (Wocke, 1867)
Epermenia iniquellus (Wocke, 1867)
Epermenia ochreomaculellus (Milliere, 1854)
Epermenia pontificella (Hübner, 1796)
Epermenia scurella (Stainton, 1851)
Ochromolopis ictella (Hübner, 1813)
Ochromolopis staintonellus (Milliere, 1869)
Phaulernis fulviguttella (Zeller, 1839)
Phaulernis rebeliella Gaedike, 1966

Erebidae
Amata kruegeri (Ragusa, 1904)
Amata phegea (Linnaeus, 1758)
Apopestes spectrum (Esper, 1787)
Arctia caja (Linnaeus, 1758)
Arctia festiva (Hufnagel, 1766)
Arctia villica (Linnaeus, 1758)
Arctornis l-nigrum (Muller, 1764)
Atolmis rubricollis (Linnaeus, 1758)
Autophila dilucida (Hübner, 1808)
Autophila limbata (Staudinger, 1871)
Autophila anaphanes Boursin, 1940
Callimorpha dominula (Linnaeus, 1758)
Calliteara pudibunda (Linnaeus, 1758)
Calymma communimacula (Denis & Schiffermuller, 1775)
Calyptra thalictri (Borkhausen, 1790)
Catephia alchymista (Denis & Schiffermuller, 1775)
Catocala coniuncta (Esper, 1787)
Catocala conversa (Esper, 1783)
Catocala dilecta (Hübner, 1808)
Catocala disjuncta (Geyer, 1828)
Catocala diversa (Geyer, 1828)
Catocala electa (Vieweg, 1790)
Catocala elocata (Esper, 1787)
Catocala fraxini (Linnaeus, 1758)
Catocala fulminea (Scopoli, 1763)
Catocala hymenaea (Denis & Schiffermuller, 1775)
Catocala lupina Herrich-Schäffer, 1851
Catocala nupta (Linnaeus, 1767)
Catocala nymphaea (Esper, 1787)
Catocala nymphagoga (Esper, 1787)
Catocala promissa (Denis & Schiffermuller, 1775)
Catocala puerpera (Giorna, 1791)
Catocala sponsa (Linnaeus, 1767)
Clytie syriaca (Bugnion, 1837)
Colobochyla salicalis (Denis & Schiffermuller, 1775)
Coscinia striata (Linnaeus, 1758)
Cybosia mesomella (Linnaeus, 1758)
Cymbalophora pudica (Esper, 1785)
Diacrisia sannio (Linnaeus, 1758)
Diaphora luctuosa (Hübner, 1831)
Diaphora mendica (Clerck, 1759)
Dicallomera fascelina (Linnaeus, 1758)
Drasteria cailino (Lefebvre, 1827)
Dysauxes ancilla (Linnaeus, 1767)
Dysauxes famula (Freyer, 1836)
Dysauxes punctata (Fabricius, 1781)
Dysgonia algira (Linnaeus, 1767)
Dysgonia torrida (Guenee, 1852)
Eilema caniola (Hübner, 1808)
Eilema complana (Linnaeus, 1758)
Eilema depressa (Esper, 1787)
Eilema lurideola (Zincken, 1817)
Eilema lutarella (Linnaeus, 1758)
Eilema palliatella (Scopoli, 1763)
Eilema pseudocomplana (Daniel, 1939)
Eilema pygmaeola (Doubleday, 1847)
Eilema sororcula (Hufnagel, 1766)
Eublemma amoena (Hübner, 1803)
Eublemma candidana (Fabricius, 1794)
Eublemma himmighoffeni (Milliere, 1867)
Eublemma minutata (Fabricius, 1794)
Eublemma ostrina (Hübner, 1808)
Eublemma parva (Hübner, 1808)
Eublemma polygramma (Duponchel, 1842)
Eublemma purpurina (Denis & Schiffermuller, 1775)
Eublemma scitula Rambur, 1833
Eublemma viridula (Guenee, 1841)
Euclidia mi (Clerck, 1759)
Euclidia glyphica (Linnaeus, 1758)
Euclidia triquetra (Denis & Schiffermuller, 1775)
Euplagia quadripunctaria (Poda, 1761)
Euproctis chrysorrhoea (Linnaeus, 1758)
Euproctis similis (Fuessly, 1775)
Exophyla rectangularis (Geyer, 1828)
Grammodes bifasciata (Petagna, 1787)
Grammodes stolida (Fabricius, 1775)
Herminia grisealis (Denis & Schiffermuller, 1775)
Herminia tarsicrinalis (Knoch, 1782)
Herminia tarsipennalis (Treitschke, 1835)
Herminia tenuialis (Rebel, 1899)
Hypena crassalis (Fabricius, 1787)
Hypena obesalis Treitschke, 1829
Hypena obsitalis (Hübner, 1813)
Hypena palpalis (Hübner, 1796)
Hypena proboscidalis (Linnaeus, 1758)
Hypena rostralis (Linnaeus, 1758)
Hypenodes humidalis Doubleday, 1850
Hyphantria cunea (Drury, 1773)
Hyphoraia aulica (Linnaeus, 1758)
Idia calvaria (Denis & Schiffermuller, 1775)
Laelia coenosa (Hübner, 1808)
Laspeyria flexula (Denis & Schiffermuller, 1775)
Leucoma salicis (Linnaeus, 1758)
Lithosia quadra (Linnaeus, 1758)
Lygephila craccae (Denis & Schiffermuller, 1775)
Lygephila lusoria (Linnaeus, 1758)
Lygephila pastinum (Treitschke, 1826)
Lygephila procax (Hübner, 1813)
Lygephila viciae (Hübner, 1822)
Lymantria dispar (Linnaeus, 1758)
Lymantria monacha (Linnaeus, 1758)
Metachrostis dardouini (Boisduval, 1840)
Metachrostis velox (Hübner, 1813)
Miltochrista miniata (Forster, 1771)
Minucia lunaris (Denis & Schiffermuller, 1775)
Nodaria nodosalis (Herrich-Schäffer, 1851)
Nudaria mundana (Linnaeus, 1761)
Ocneria ledereri (Milliere, 1869)
Ocneria rubea (Denis & Schiffermuller, 1775)
Odice arcuinna (Hübner, 1790)
Odice suava (Hübner, 1813)
Ophiusa tirhaca (Cramer, 1773)
Orectis proboscidata (Herrich-Schäffer, 1851)
Orgyia recens (Hübner, 1819)
Orgyia antiqua (Linnaeus, 1758)
Paracolax tristalis (Fabricius, 1794)
Parascotia fuliginaria (Linnaeus, 1761)
Parasemia plantaginis (Linnaeus, 1758)
Parocneria detrita (Esper, 1785)
Parocneria terebinthi (Freyer, 1838)
Pechipogo plumigeralis Hübner, 1825
Pechipogo strigilata (Linnaeus, 1758)
Pelosia obtusa (Herrich-Schäffer, 1852)
Penthophera morio (Linnaeus, 1767)
Pericallia matronula (Linnaeus, 1758)
Phragmatobia fuliginosa (Linnaeus, 1758)
Phragmatobia luctifera (Denis & Schiffermuller, 1775)
Phytometra viridaria (Clerck, 1759)
Polypogon gryphalis (Herrich-Schäffer, 1851)
Polypogon tentacularia (Linnaeus, 1758)
Rhypagla lacernaria (Hübner, 1813)
Rhyparia purpurata (Linnaeus, 1758)
Rivula sericealis (Scopoli, 1763)
Schrankia costaestrigalis (Stephens, 1834)
Schrankia taenialis (Hübner, 1809)
Scoliopteryx libatrix (Linnaeus, 1758)
Setina irrorella (Linnaeus, 1758)
Simplicia rectalis (Eversmann, 1842)
Spilosoma lubricipeda (Linnaeus, 1758)
Spilosoma lutea (Hufnagel, 1766)
Spilosoma urticae (Esper, 1789)
Tathorhynchus exsiccata (Lederer, 1855)
Trisateles emortualis (Denis & Schiffermuller, 1775)
Tyria jacobaeae (Linnaeus, 1758)
Utetheisa pulchella (Linnaeus, 1758)
Zanclognatha zelleralis (Wocke, 1850)
Zebeeba falsalis (Herrich-Schäffer, 1839)
Zekelita antiqualis (Hübner, 1809)
Zethes insularis Rambur, 1833

Euteliidae
Eutelia adoratrix (Staudinger, 1892)
Eutelia adulatrix (Hübner, 1813)

Gelechiidae
Acompsia cinerella (Clerck, 1759)
Acompsia tripunctella (Denis & Schiffermuller, 1775)
Altenia elsneriella Huemer & Karsholt, 1999
Altenia modesta (Danilevsky, 1955)
Altenia scriptella (Hübner, 1796)
Altenia wagneriella (Rebel, 1926)
Anacampsis timidella (Wocke, 1887)
Anarsia lineatella Zeller, 1839
Anasphaltis renigerellus (Zeller, 1839)
Aproaerema anthyllidella (Hübner, 1813)
Argolamprotes micella (Denis & Schiffermuller, 1775)
Aristotelia decurtella (Hübner, 1813)
Aristotelia subericinella (Duponchel, 1843)
Athrips rancidella (Herrich-Schäffer, 1854)
Bryotropha hendrikseni Karsholt & Rutten, 2005
Bryotropha hulli Karsholt & Rutten, 2005
Bryotropha patockai Elsner & Karsholt, 2003
Bryotropha plebejella (Zeller, 1847)
Bryotropha senectella (Zeller, 1839)
Bryotropha terrella (Denis & Schiffermuller, 1775)
Carpatolechia decorella (Haworth, 1812)
Caryocolum blandulella (Tutt, 1887)
Caryocolum leucomelanella (Zeller, 1839)
Caryocolum saginella (Zeller, 1868)
Caryocolum schleichi (Christoph, 1872)
Caryocolum tischeriella (Zeller, 1839)
Caulastrocecis pudicellus (Mann, 1861)
Chionodes holosericella (Herrich-Schäffer, 1854)
Crossobela trinotella (Herrich-Schäffer, 1856)
Dactylotula kinkerella (Snellen, 1876)
Dichomeris alacella (Zeller, 1839)
Dichomeris derasella (Denis & Schiffermuller, 1775)
Ephysteris iberica Povolny, 1977
Eulamprotes baldizzonei Huemer & Karsholt, 2013
Exoteleia dodecella (Linnaeus, 1758)
Gelechia dujardini Huemer, 1991
Gelechia senticetella (Staudinger, 1859)
Gelechia turpella (Denis & Schiffermuller, 1775)
Helcystogramma lutatella (Herrich-Schäffer, 1854)
Istrianis brucinella (Mann, 1872)
Istrianis femoralis (Staudinger, 1876)
Iwaruna biguttella (Duponchel, 1843)
Lutilabria lutilabrella (Mann, 1857)
Mesophleps oxycedrella (Milliere, 1871)
Metzneria aestivella (Zeller, 1839)
Metzneria artificella (Herrich-Schäffer, 1861)
Metzneria campicolella (Mann, 1857)
Metzneria diffusella Englert, 1974
Metzneria intestinella (Mann, 1864)
Metzneria neuropterella (Zeller, 1839)
Metzneria tenuiella (Mann, 1864)
Metzneria torosulella (Rebel, 1893)
Mirificarma cytisella (Treitschke, 1833)
Mirificarma eburnella (Denis & Schiffermuller, 1775)
Mirificarma maculatella (Hübner, 1796)
Mirificarma mulinella (Zeller, 1839)
Monochroa nomadella (Zeller, 1868)
Neotelphusa cisti (Stainton, 1869)
Nothris lemniscellus (Zeller, 1839)
Ochrodia subdiminutella (Stainton, 1867)
Ornativalva heluanensis (Debski, 1913)
Ornativalva tamaricella (Zeller, 1850)
Parachronistis albiceps (Zeller, 1839)
Parastenolechia nigrinotella (Zeller, 1847)
Pexicopia malvella (Hübner, 1805)
Phthorimaea operculella (Zeller, 1873)
Prolita sexpunctella (Fabricius, 1794)
Psamathocrita dalmatinella Huemer & Tokar, 2000
Pseudotelphusa istrella (Mann, 1866)
Pseudotelphusa paripunctella (Thunberg, 1794)
Pseudotelphusa scalella (Scopoli, 1763)
Ptocheuusa minimella (Rebel, 1936)
Ptocheuusa paupella (Zeller, 1847)
Pyncostola bohemiella (Nickerl, 1864)
Recurvaria nanella (Denis & Schiffermuller, 1775)
Scrobipalpa acuminatella (Sircom, 1850)
Scrobipalpa arenbergeri Povolny, 1973
Scrobipalpa artemisiella (Treitschke, 1833)
Scrobipalpa hungariae (Staudinger, 1871)
Scrobipalpa ocellatella (Boyd, 1858)
Scrobipalpa portosanctana (Stainton, 1859)
Scrobipalpa salinella (Zeller, 1847)
Scrobipalpa samadensis (Pfaffenzeller, 1870)
Scrobipalpa suaedicola (Mabille, 1906)
Scrobipalpa tokari Huemer & Karsholt, 2010
Scrobipalpa voltinella (Chretien, 1898)
Sitotroga cerealella (Olivier, 1789)
Sophronia ascalis Gozmany, 1951
Stenolechiodes pseudogemmellus Elsner, 1996
Stomopteryx detersella (Zeller, 1847)
Syncopacma captivella (Herrich-Schäffer, 1854)
Syncopacma patruella (Mann, 1857)
Syncopacma polychromella (Rebel, 1902)
Syncopacma sangiella (Stainton, 1863)
Teleiopsis terebinthinella (Herrich-Schäffer, 1856)
Thiotricha majorella (Rebel, 1910)
Xystophora carchariella (Zeller, 1839)

Geometridae
Abraxas grossulariata (Linnaeus, 1758)
Abraxas pantaria (Linnaeus, 1767)
Agriopis bajaria (Denis & Schiffermuller, 1775)
Agriopis leucophaearia (Denis & Schiffermuller, 1775)
Agriopis marginaria (Fabricius, 1776)
Alsophila aceraria (Denis & Schiffermuller, 1775)
Alsophila aescularia (Denis & Schiffermuller, 1775)
Anticlea derivata (Denis & Schiffermuller, 1775)
Anticollix sparsata (Treitschke, 1828)
Aplasta ononaria (Fuessly, 1783)
Aplocera efformata (Guenee, 1858)
Aplocera plagiata (Linnaeus, 1758)
Aplocera praeformata (Hübner, 1826)
Aplocera simpliciata (Treitschke, 1835)
Apocheima hispidaria (Denis & Schiffermuller, 1775)
Ascotis selenaria (Denis & Schiffermuller, 1775)
Aspitates ochrearia (Rossi, 1794)
Asthena albulata (Hufnagel, 1767)
Asthena anseraria (Herrich-Schäffer, 1855)
Biston betularia (Linnaeus, 1758)
Biston strataria (Hufnagel, 1767)
Boudinotiana notha (Hübner, 1803)
Campaea honoraria (Denis & Schiffermuller, 1775)
Campaea margaritaria (Linnaeus, 1761)
Camptogramma bilineata (Linnaeus, 1758)
Camptogramma scripturata (Hübner, 1799)
Cataclysme riguata (Hübner, 1813)
Catarhoe cuculata (Hufnagel, 1767)
Catarhoe putridaria (Herrich-Schäffer, 1852)
Catarhoe rubidata (Denis & Schiffermuller, 1775)
Charissa obscurata (Denis & Schiffermuller, 1775)
Charissa variegata (Duponchel, 1830)
Charissa supinaria (Mann, 1854)
Charissa glaucinaria (Hübner, 1799)
Chemerina caliginearia (Rambur, 1833)
Chesias capriata Prout, 1904
Chesias rufata (Fabricius, 1775)
Chiasmia aestimaria (Hübner, 1809)
Chiasmia clathrata (Linnaeus, 1758)
Chlorissa cloraria (Hübner, 1813)
Chlorissa viridata (Linnaeus, 1758)
Chloroclysta siterata (Hufnagel, 1767)
Chloroclystis v-ata (Haworth, 1809)
Cidaria fulvata (Forster, 1771)
Coenotephria ablutaria (Boisduval, 1840)
Coenotephria tophaceata (Denis & Schiffermuller, 1775)
Colostygia aqueata (Hübner, 1813)
Colostygia fitzi (Schawerda, 1914)
Colostygia olivata (Denis & Schiffermuller, 1775)
Colostygia pectinataria (Knoch, 1781)
Colostygia sericeata (Schwingenschuss, 1926)
Colotois pennaria (Linnaeus, 1761)
Comibaena bajularia (Denis & Schiffermuller, 1775)
Cosmorhoe ocellata (Linnaeus, 1758)
Costaconvexa polygrammata (Borkhausen, 1794)
Crocallis elinguaria (Linnaeus, 1758)
Crocallis tusciaria (Borkhausen, 1793)
Cyclophora linearia (Hübner, 1799)
Cyclophora porata (Linnaeus, 1767)
Cyclophora punctaria (Linnaeus, 1758)
Cyclophora suppunctaria (Zeller, 1847)
Cyclophora albiocellaria (Hübner, 1789)
Cyclophora albipunctata (Hufnagel, 1767)
Cyclophora annularia (Fabricius, 1775)
Cyclophora puppillaria (Hübner, 1799)
Cyclophora ruficiliaria (Herrich-Schäffer, 1855)
Dasycorsa modesta (Staudinger, 1879)
Dyscia innocentaria (Christoph, 1885)
Dyscia raunaria (Freyer, 1852)
Dysstroma citrata (Linnaeus, 1761)
Dysstroma truncata (Hufnagel, 1767)
Earophila badiata (Denis & Schiffermuller, 1775)
Ecliptopera silaceata (Denis & Schiffermuller, 1775)
Electrophaes corylata (Thunberg, 1792)
Ematurga atomaria (Linnaeus, 1758)
Emmiltis pygmaearia (Hübner, 1809)
Ennomos quercaria (Hübner, 1813)
Ennomos quercinaria (Hufnagel, 1767)
Entephria caesiata (Denis & Schiffermuller, 1775)
Entephria cyanata (Hübner, 1809)
Epirrhoe alternata (Muller, 1764)
Epirrhoe galiata (Denis & Schiffermuller, 1775)
Epirrhoe molluginata (Hübner, 1813)
Epirrhoe rivata (Hübner, 1813)
Epirrhoe tristata (Linnaeus, 1758)
Epirrita autumnata (Borkhausen, 1794)
Epirrita christyi (Allen, 1906)
Epirrita dilutata (Denis & Schiffermuller, 1775)
Erannis defoliaria (Clerck, 1759)
Euchoeca nebulata (Scopoli, 1763)
Eucrostes indigenata (de Villers, 1789)
Eulithis populata (Linnaeus, 1758)
Eulithis prunata (Linnaeus, 1758)
Eumera regina Staudinger, 1892
Euphyia adumbraria (Herrich-Schäffer, 1852)
Euphyia biangulata (Haworth, 1809)
Euphyia mesembrina (Rebel, 1927)
Eupithecia abbreviata Stephens, 1831
Eupithecia abietaria (Goeze, 1781)
Eupithecia absinthiata (Clerck, 1759)
Eupithecia assimilata Doubleday, 1856
Eupithecia breviculata (Donzel, 1837)
Eupithecia centaureata (Denis & Schiffermuller, 1775)
Eupithecia cocciferata Milliere, 1864
Eupithecia cuculliaria (Rebel, 1901)
Eupithecia distinctaria Herrich-Schäffer, 1848
Eupithecia dodoneata Guenee, 1858
Eupithecia druentiata Dietze, 1902
Eupithecia ericeata (Rambur, 1833)
Eupithecia expallidata Doubleday, 1856
Eupithecia gemellata Herrich-Schäffer, 1861
Eupithecia graphata (Treitschke, 1828)
Eupithecia gratiosata Herrich-Schäffer, 1861
Eupithecia haworthiata Doubleday, 1856
Eupithecia icterata (de Villers, 1789)
Eupithecia innotata (Hufnagel, 1767)
Eupithecia insigniata (Hübner, 1790)
Eupithecia irriguata (Hübner, 1813)
Eupithecia laquaearia Herrich-Schäffer, 1848
Eupithecia linariata (Denis & Schiffermuller, 1775)
Eupithecia pauxillaria Boisduval, 1840
Eupithecia phoeniceata (Rambur, 1834)
Eupithecia pimpinellata (Hübner, 1813)
Eupithecia plumbeolata (Haworth, 1809)
Eupithecia pusillata (Denis & Schiffermuller, 1775)
Eupithecia riparia Herrich-Schäffer, 1851
Eupithecia scopariata (Rambur, 1833)
Eupithecia selinata Herrich-Schäffer, 1861
Eupithecia semigraphata Bruand, 1850
Eupithecia subfuscata (Haworth, 1809)
Eupithecia tantillaria Boisduval, 1840
Eupithecia tenuiata (Hübner, 1813)
Eupithecia tripunctaria Herrich-Schäffer, 1852
Eupithecia unedonata Mabille, 1868
Eupithecia variostrigata Alphéraky, 1876
Eupithecia venosata (Fabricius, 1787)
Eupithecia vulgata (Haworth, 1809)
Gandaritis pyraliata (Denis & Schiffermuller, 1775)
Geometra papilionaria (Linnaeus, 1758)
Gnopharmia stevenaria (Boisduval, 1840)
Gnophos sartata Treitschke, 1827
Gnophos dumetata Treitschke, 1827
Gymnoscelis rufifasciata (Haworth, 1809)
Heliomata glarearia (Denis & Schiffermuller, 1775)
Hemistola chrysoprasaria (Esper, 1795)
Hemithea aestivaria (Hübner, 1789)
Horisme calligraphata (Herrich-Schäffer, 1838)
Horisme corticata (Treitschke, 1835)
Horisme radicaria (de La Harpe, 1855)
Horisme tersata (Denis & Schiffermuller, 1775)
Horisme vitalbata (Denis & Schiffermuller, 1775)
Hydrelia flammeolaria (Hufnagel, 1767)
Hydrelia sylvata (Denis & Schiffermuller, 1775)
Hydria cervinalis (Scopoli, 1763)
Hydriomena furcata (Thunberg, 1784)
Hydriomena impluviata (Denis & Schiffermuller, 1775)
Hypomecis punctinalis (Scopoli, 1763)
Idaea albitorquata (Pungeler, 1909)
Idaea aureolaria (Denis & Schiffermuller, 1775)
Idaea aversata (Linnaeus, 1758)
Idaea camparia (Herrich-Schäffer, 1852)
Idaea circuitaria (Hübner, 1819)
Idaea consanguinaria (Lederer, 1853)
Idaea consolidata (Lederer, 1853)
Idaea contiguaria (Hübner, 1799)
Idaea degeneraria (Hübner, 1799)
Idaea deversaria (Herrich-Schäffer, 1847)
Idaea dilutaria (Hübner, 1799)
Idaea dimidiata (Hufnagel, 1767)
Idaea distinctaria (Boisduval, 1840)
Idaea elongaria (Rambur, 1833)
Idaea filicata (Hübner, 1799)
Idaea infirmaria (Rambur, 1833)
Idaea inquinata (Scopoli, 1763)
Idaea laevigata (Scopoli, 1763)
Idaea leipnitzi Hausmann, 2004
Idaea metohiensis (Rebel, 1900)
Idaea moniliata (Denis & Schiffermuller, 1775)
Idaea muricata (Hufnagel, 1767)
Idaea nitidata (Herrich-Schäffer, 1861)
Idaea obsoletaria (Rambur, 1833)
Idaea ochrata (Scopoli, 1763)
Idaea ostrinaria (Hübner, 1813)
Idaea politaria (Hübner, 1799)
Idaea rubraria (Staudinger, 1901)
Idaea rufaria (Hübner, 1799)
Idaea rusticata (Denis & Schiffermuller, 1775)
Idaea seriata (Schrank, 1802)
Idaea sericeata (Hübner, 1813)
Idaea serpentata (Hufnagel, 1767)
Idaea subsericeata (Haworth, 1809)
Idaea trigeminata (Haworth, 1809)
Jodis lactearia (Linnaeus, 1758)
Larentia malvata (Rambur, 1833)
Ligdia adustata (Denis & Schiffermuller, 1775)
Lomographa temerata (Denis & Schiffermuller, 1775)
Lycia graecarius (Staudinger, 1861)
Lycia hirtaria (Clerck, 1759)
Lythria purpuraria (Linnaeus, 1758)
Melanthia procellata (Denis & Schiffermuller, 1775)
Menophra abruptaria (Thunberg, 1792)
Mesoleuca albicillata (Linnaeus, 1758)
Mesotype parallelolineata (Retzius, 1783)
Microloxia herbaria (Hübner, 1813)
Minoa murinata (Scopoli, 1763)
Nebula achromaria (de La Harpe, 1853)
Nebula nebulata (Treitschke, 1828)
Nebula senectaria (Herrich-Schäffer, 1852)
Nychiodes dalmatina Wagner, 1909
Nycterosea obstipata (Fabricius, 1794)
Odezia atrata (Linnaeus, 1758)
Operophtera brumata (Linnaeus, 1758)
Operophtera fagata (Scharfenberg, 1805)
Opisthograptis luteolata (Linnaeus, 1758)
Orthonama vittata (Borkhausen, 1794)
Orthostixis cribraria (Hübner, 1799)
Pachycnemia hippocastanaria (Hübner, 1799)
Pachycnemia tibiaria (Rambur, 1829)
Pareulype berberata (Denis & Schiffermuller, 1775)
Pasiphila chloerata (Mabille, 1870)
Pasiphila debiliata (Hübner, 1817)
Pasiphila rectangulata (Linnaeus, 1758)
Pennithera ulicata (Rambur, 1934)
Peribatodes correptaria (Zeller, 1847)
Peribatodes rhomboidaria (Denis & Schiffermuller, 1775)
Peribatodes secundaria (Denis & Schiffermuller, 1775)
Peribatodes umbraria (Hübner, 1809)
Perizoma albulata (Denis & Schiffermuller, 1775)
Perizoma alchemillata (Linnaeus, 1758)
Perizoma bifaciata (Haworth, 1809)
Perizoma blandiata (Denis & Schiffermuller, 1775)
Perizoma flavofasciata (Thunberg, 1792)
Perizoma flavosparsata (Wagner, 1926)
Perizoma lugdunaria (Herrich-Schäffer, 1855)
Perizoma minorata (Treitschke, 1828)
Petrophora chlorosata (Scopoli, 1763)
Phaiogramma etruscaria (Zeller, 1849)
Phibalapteryx virgata (Hufnagel, 1767)
Philereme transversata (Hufnagel, 1767)
Philereme vetulata (Denis & Schiffermuller, 1775)
Plemyria rubiginata (Denis & Schiffermuller, 1775)
Pseudobaptria bogumilaria (Rebel, 1904)
Pseudopanthera macularia (Linnaeus, 1758)
Pseudoterpna pruinata (Hufnagel, 1767)
Pterapherapteryx sexalata (Retzius, 1783)
Rhodometra sacraria (Linnaeus, 1767)
Rhodostrophia calabra (Petagna, 1786)
Rhodostrophia vibicaria (Clerck, 1759)
Rhoptria asperaria (Hübner, 1817)
Schistostege decussata (Denis & Schiffermuller, 1775)
Scopula beckeraria (Lederer, 1853)
Scopula confinaria (Herrich-Schäffer, 1847)
Scopula emutaria (Hübner, 1809)
Scopula flaccidaria (Zeller, 1852)
Scopula imitaria (Hübner, 1799)
Scopula immutata (Linnaeus, 1758)
Scopula incanata (Linnaeus, 1758)
Scopula marginepunctata (Goeze, 1781)
Scopula caricaria (Reutti, 1853)
Scopula decorata (Denis & Schiffermuller, 1775)
Scopula immorata (Linnaeus, 1758)
Scopula nigropunctata (Hufnagel, 1767)
Scopula ornata (Scopoli, 1763)
Scopula rubiginata (Hufnagel, 1767)
Scopula submutata (Treitschke, 1828)
Scopula tessellaria (Boisduval, 1840)
Scopula virgulata (Denis & Schiffermuller, 1775)
Scotopteryx bipunctaria (Denis & Schiffermuller, 1775)
Scotopteryx chenopodiata (Linnaeus, 1758)
Scotopteryx coarctaria (Denis & Schiffermuller, 1775)
Scotopteryx luridata (Hufnagel, 1767)
Scotopteryx moeniata (Scopoli, 1763)
Scotopteryx mucronata (Scopoli, 1763)
Scotopteryx vicinaria (Duponchel, 1830)
Selenia lunularia (Hübner, 1788)
Selidosema plumaria (Denis & Schiffermuller, 1775)
Siona lineata (Scopoli, 1763)
Stegania dalmataria Guenee, 1858
Stegania trimaculata (de Villers, 1789)
Synopsia sociaria (Hübner, 1799)
Tephronia sepiaria (Hufnagel, 1767)
Thalera fimbrialis (Scopoli, 1763)
Thera britannica (Turner, 1925)
Thera cupressata (Geyer, 1831)
Thera juniperata (Linnaeus, 1758)
Thera variata (Denis & Schiffermuller, 1775)
Thetidia smaragdaria (Fabricius, 1787)
Timandra comae Schmidt, 1931
Triphosa dubitata (Linnaeus, 1758)
Triphosa sabaudiata (Duponchel, 1830)
Venusia cambrica Curtis, 1839
Xanthorhoe biriviata (Borkhausen, 1794)
Xanthorhoe designata (Hufnagel, 1767)
Xanthorhoe ferrugata (Clerck, 1759)
Xanthorhoe fluctuata (Linnaeus, 1758)
Xanthorhoe incursata (Hübner, 1813)
Xanthorhoe montanata (Denis & Schiffermuller, 1775)
Xanthorhoe oxybiata (Milliere, 1872)
Xanthorhoe quadrifasiata (Clerck, 1759)
Xanthorhoe spadicearia (Denis & Schiffermuller, 1775)
Xenochlorodes olympiaria (Herrich-Schäffer, 1852)

Glyphipterigidae
Acrolepia autumnitella Curtis, 1838
Acrolepiopsis marcidella (Curtis, 1850)
Acrolepiopsis vesperella (Zeller, 1850)
Digitivalva heringi (Klimesch, 1956)
Digitivalva perlepidella (Stainton, 1849)
Digitivalva reticulella (Hübner, 1796)
Digitivalva occidentella (Klimesch, 1956)
Digitivalva orientella (Klimesch, 1956)
Digitivalva pulicariae (Klimesch, 1956)
Digitivalva wolfschlaegeri (Klimesch, 1956)

Gracillariidae
Acrocercops brongniardella (Fabricius, 1798)
Aspilapteryx limosella (Duponchel, 1843)
Aspilapteryx tringipennella (Zeller, 1839)
Caloptilia elongella (Linnaeus, 1761)
Caloptilia falconipennella (Hübner, 1813)
Caloptilia fidella (Reutti, 1853)
Caloptilia fribergensis (Fritzsche, 1871)
Caloptilia nobilella (Klimesch, 1942)
Caloptilia stigmatella (Fabricius, 1781)
Cameraria ohridella Deschka & Dimic, 1986
Cupedia cupediella (Herrich-Schäffer, 1855)
Dialectica scalariella (Zeller, 1850)
Euspilapteryx auroguttella Stephens, 1835
Micrurapteryx kollariella (Zeller, 1839)
Parectopa robiniella Clemens, 1863
Parornix ampliatella (Stainton, 1850)
Parornix anguliferella (Zeller, 1847)
Parornix carpinella (Frey, 1863)
Parornix devoniella (Stainton, 1850)
Parornix fagivora (Frey, 1861)
Parornix scoticella (Stainton, 1850)
Phyllocnistis saligna (Zeller, 1839)
Phyllonorycter abrasella (Duponchel, 1843)
Phyllonorycter amseli (Povolny & Gregor, 1955)
Phyllonorycter belotella (Staudinger, 1859)
Phyllonorycter cephalariae (Lhomme, 1934)
Phyllonorycter coryli (Nicelli, 1851)
Phyllonorycter corylifoliella (Hübner, 1796)
Phyllonorycter esperella (Goeze, 1783)
Phyllonorycter eugregori A. & Z. Lastuvka, 2006
Phyllonorycter fiumella (Krone, 1910)
Phyllonorycter geniculella (Ragonot, 1874)
Phyllonorycter helianthemella (Herrich-Schäffer, 1861)
Phyllonorycter klemannella (Fabricius, 1781)
Phyllonorycter kusdasi Deschka, 1970
Phyllonorycter lantanella (Schrank, 1802)
Phyllonorycter lapadiella (Krone, 1909)
Phyllonorycter leucographella (Zeller, 1850)
Phyllonorycter maestingella (Muller, 1764)
Phyllonorycter mannii (Zeller, 1846)
Phyllonorycter messaniella (Zeller, 1846)
Phyllonorycter millierella (Staudinger, 1871)
Phyllonorycter oxyacanthae (Frey, 1856)
Phyllonorycter robiniella (Clemens, 1859)
Phyllonorycter suberifoliella (Zeller, 1850)
Phyllonorycter sublautella (Stainton, 1869)
Phyllonorycter triflorella (Peyerimhoff, 1872)

Heliozelidae
Antispila metallella (Denis & Schiffermuller, 1775)
Heliozela sericiella (Haworth, 1828)

Hepialidae
Pharmacis lupulina (Linnaeus, 1758)
Triodia adriaticus (Osthelder, 1931)
Triodia sylvina (Linnaeus, 1761)

Heterogynidae
Heterogynis penella (Hübner, 1819)

Incurvariidae
Incurvaria masculella (Denis & Schiffermuller, 1775)
Incurvaria oehlmanniella (Hübner, 1796)
Incurvaria pectinea Haworth, 1828

Lasiocampidae
Cosmotriche lobulina (Denis & Schiffermuller, 1775)
Dendrolimus pini (Linnaeus, 1758)
Eriogaster catax (Linnaeus, 1758)
Eriogaster lanestris (Linnaeus, 1758)
Eriogaster rimicola (Denis & Schiffermuller, 1775)
Gastropacha quercifolia (Linnaeus, 1758)
Gastropacha populifolia (Denis & Schiffermuller, 1775)
Lasiocampa quercus (Linnaeus, 1758)
Lasiocampa trifolii (Denis & Schiffermuller, 1775)
Macrothylacia rubi (Linnaeus, 1758)
Malacosoma castrensis (Linnaeus, 1758)
Malacosoma neustria (Linnaeus, 1758)
Odonestis pruni (Linnaeus, 1758)
Phyllodesma tremulifolia (Hübner, 1810)
Poecilocampa alpina (Frey & Wullschlegel, 1874)
Poecilocampa populi (Linnaeus, 1758)
Trichiura crataegi (Linnaeus, 1758)

Lecithoceridae
Lecithocera nigrana (Duponchel, 1836)
Odites kollarella (O. G. Costa, 1832)

Limacodidae
Apoda limacodes (Hufnagel, 1766)
Heterogenea asella (Denis & Schiffermuller, 1775)

Lyonetiidae
Leucoptera aceris (Fuchs, 1903)
Leucoptera heringiella Toll, 1938
Leucoptera laburnella (Stainton, 1851)
Leucoptera lotella (Stainton, 1859)
Leucoptera malifoliella (O. Costa, 1836)
Lyonetia clerkella (Linnaeus, 1758)
Lyonetia prunifoliella (Hübner, 1796)

Lypusidae
Pseudatemelia aeneella Rebel, 1910
Pseudatemelia chalcocrates (Meyrick, 1930)
Pseudatemelia flavifrontella (Denis & Schiffermuller, 1775)

Micropterigidae
Micropterix allionella (Fabricius, 1794)
Micropterix amsella Heath, 1975
Micropterix aruncella (Scopoli, 1763)
Micropterix croatica Heath & Kaltenbach, 1984
Micropterix facetella Zeller, 1850
Micropterix myrtetella Zeller, 1850
Micropterix rothenbachii Frey, 1856

Millieridae
Millieria dolosalis (Heydenreich, 1851)

Momphidae
Mompha langiella (Hübner, 1796)
Mompha miscella (Denis & Schiffermuller, 1775)
Mompha divisella Herrich-Schäffer, 1854
Mompha epilobiella (Denis & Schiffermuller, 1775)
Mompha subbistrigella (Haworth, 1828)

Nepticulidae
Acalyptris limonii Z. & A. Lastuvka, 1998
Acalyptris maritima A. & Z. Lastuvka, 1997
Acalyptris minimella (Rebel, 1924)
Acalyptris platani (Muller-Rutz, 1934)
Bohemannia pulverosella (Stainton, 1849)
Ectoedemia agrimoniae (Frey, 1858)
Ectoedemia albifasciella (Heinemann, 1871)
Ectoedemia angulifasciella (Stainton, 1849)
Ectoedemia arcuatella (Herrich-Schäffer, 1855)
Ectoedemia argyropeza (Zeller, 1839)
Ectoedemia atricollis (Stainton, 1857)
Ectoedemia caradjai (Groschke, 1944)
Ectoedemia cerris (Zimmermann, 1944)
Ectoedemia erythrogenella (de Joannis, 1908)
Ectoedemia gilvipennella (Klimesch, 1946)
Ectoedemia hannoverella (Glitz, 1872)
Ectoedemia haraldi (Soffner, 1942)
Ectoedemia heringella (Mariani, 1939)
Ectoedemia heringi (Toll, 1934)
Ectoedemia intimella (Zeller, 1848)
Ectoedemia klimeschi (Skala, 1933)
Ectoedemia liechtensteini (Zimmermann, 1944)
Ectoedemia mahalebella (Klimesch, 1936)
Ectoedemia occultella (Linnaeus, 1767)
Ectoedemia quinquella (Bedell, 1848)
Ectoedemia rubivora (Wocke, 1860)
Ectoedemia spinosella (de Joannis, 1908)
Ectoedemia subbimaculella (Haworth, 1828)
Ectoedemia turbidella (Zeller, 1848)
Ectoedemia decentella (Herrich-Schäffer, 1855)
Ectoedemia louisella (Sircom, 1849)
Ectoedemia obtusa (Puplesis & Diskus, 1996)
Ectoedemia sericopeza (Zeller, 1839)
Ectoedemia groschkei (Skala, 1943)
Ectoedemia septembrella (Stainton, 1849)
Ectoedemia amani Svensson, 1966
Ectoedemia longicaudella Klimesch, 1953
Ectoedemia reichli Z. & A. Lastuvka, 1998
Parafomoria helianthemella (Herrich-Schäffer, 1860)
Parafomoria pseudocistivora van Nieukerken, 1983
Simplimorpha promissa (Staudinger, 1871)
Stigmella aceris (Frey, 1857)
Stigmella aeneofasciella (Herrich-Schäffer, 1855)
Stigmella alnetella (Stainton, 1856)
Stigmella anomalella (Goeze, 1783)
Stigmella assimilella (Zeller, 1848)
Stigmella atricapitella (Haworth, 1828)
Stigmella aurella (Fabricius, 1775)
Stigmella auromarginella (Richardson, 1890)
Stigmella basiguttella (Heinemann, 1862)
Stigmella betulicola (Stainton, 1856)
Stigmella carpinella (Heinemann, 1862)
Stigmella catharticella (Stainton, 1853)
Stigmella centifoliella (Zeller, 1848)
Stigmella crataegella (Klimesch, 1936)
Stigmella desperatella (Frey, 1856)
Stigmella dorsiguttella (Johansson, 1971)
Stigmella eberhardi (Johansson, 1971)
Stigmella fasciata van Nieukerken & Johansson, 2003
Stigmella floslactella (Haworth, 1828)
Stigmella freyella (Heyden, 1858)
Stigmella glutinosae (Stainton, 1858)
Stigmella hahniella (Worz, 1937)
Stigmella hemargyrella (Kollar, 1832)
Stigmella hybnerella (Hübner, 1796)
Stigmella incognitella (Herrich-Schäffer, 1855)
Stigmella johanssonella A. & Z. Lastuvka, 1997
Stigmella lapponica (Wocke, 1862)
Stigmella lemniscella (Zeller, 1839)
Stigmella luteella (Stainton, 1857)
Stigmella malella (Stainton, 1854)
Stigmella mespilicola (Frey, 1856)
Stigmella microtheriella (Stainton, 1854)
Stigmella minusculella (Herrich-Schäffer, 1855)
Stigmella nivenburgensis (Preissecker, 1942)
Stigmella nylandriella (Tengstrom, 1848)
Stigmella obliquella (Heinemann, 1862)
Stigmella oxyacanthella (Stainton, 1854)
Stigmella paliurella Gerasimov, 1937
Stigmella paradoxa (Frey, 1858)
Stigmella perpygmaeella (Doubleday, 1859)
Stigmella plagicolella (Stainton, 1854)
Stigmella prunetorum (Stainton, 1855)
Stigmella pyri (Glitz, 1865)
Stigmella regiella (Herrich-Schäffer, 1855)
Stigmella rhamnella (Herrich-Schäffer, 1860)
Stigmella roborella (Johansson, 1971)
Stigmella rolandi van Nieukerken, 1990
Stigmella salicis (Stainton, 1854)
Stigmella samiatella (Zeller, 1839)
Stigmella speciosa (Frey, 1858)
Stigmella splendidissimella (Herrich-Schäffer, 1855)
Stigmella suberivora (Stainton, 1869)
Stigmella thuringiaca (Petry, 1904)
Stigmella tiliae (Frey, 1856)
Stigmella trimaculella (Haworth, 1828)
Stigmella ulmivora (Fologne, 1860)
Stigmella viscerella (Stainton, 1853)
Stigmella zangherii (Klimesch, 1951)
Trifurcula bleonella (Chretien, 1904)
Trifurcula headleyella (Stainton, 1854)
Trifurcula istriae A. & Z. Lastuvka, 2000
Trifurcula melanoptera van Nieukerken & Puplesis, 1991
Trifurcula saturejae (Parenti, 1963)
Trifurcula cryptella (Stainton, 1856)
Trifurcula eurema (Tutt, 1899)
Trifurcula manygoza van Nieukerken, A. & Z. Lastuvka, 2007
Trifurcula ortneri (Klimesch, 1951)
Trifurcula aurella Rebel, 1933
Trifurcula calycotomella A. & Z. Lastuvka, 1997
Trifurcula josefklimeschi van Nieukerken, 1990
Trifurcula orientella Klimesch, 1953
Trifurcula pallidella (Duponchel, 1843)

Noctuidae
Abrostola agnorista Dufay, 1956
Abrostola asclepiadis (Denis & Schiffermuller, 1775)
Abrostola tripartita (Hufnagel, 1766)
Abrostola triplasia (Linnaeus, 1758)
Acontia lucida (Hufnagel, 1766)
Acontia trabealis (Scopoli, 1763)
Acontia melanura (Tauscher, 1809)
Acontiola moldavicola (Herrich-Schäffer, 1851)
Acosmetia caliginosa (Hübner, 1813)
Acronicta aceris (Linnaeus, 1758)
Acronicta leporina (Linnaeus, 1758)
Acronicta strigosa (Denis & Schiffermuller, 1775)
Acronicta alni (Linnaeus, 1767)
Acronicta cuspis (Hübner, 1813)
Acronicta psi (Linnaeus, 1758)
Acronicta tridens (Denis & Schiffermuller, 1775)
Acronicta auricoma (Denis & Schiffermuller, 1775)
Acronicta euphorbiae (Denis & Schiffermuller, 1775)
Acronicta orientalis (Mann, 1862)
Acronicta rumicis (Linnaeus, 1758)
Actebia praecox (Linnaeus, 1758)
Actebia fugax (Treitschke, 1825)
Actinotia polyodon (Clerck, 1759)
Actinotia radiosa (Esper, 1804)
Aedia funesta (Esper, 1786)
Aedia leucomelas (Linnaeus, 1758)
Aegle kaekeritziana (Hübner, 1799)
Aegle semicana (Esper, 1798)
Agrochola lychnidis (Denis & Schiffermuller, 1775)
Agrochola lactiflora Draudt, 1934
Agrochola helvola (Linnaeus, 1758)
Agrochola humilis (Denis & Schiffermuller, 1775)
Agrochola kindermannii (Fischer v. Röslerstamm, 1837)
Agrochola litura (Linnaeus, 1758)
Agrochola nitida (Denis & Schiffermuller, 1775)
Agrochola thurneri Boursin, 1953
Agrochola lota (Clerck, 1759)
Agrochola macilenta (Hübner, 1809)
Agrochola laevis (Hübner, 1803)
Agrotis bigramma (Esper, 1790)
Agrotis cinerea (Denis & Schiffermuller, 1775)
Agrotis clavis (Hufnagel, 1766)
Agrotis exclamationis (Linnaeus, 1758)
Agrotis ipsilon (Hufnagel, 1766)
Agrotis puta (Hübner, 1803)
Agrotis segetum (Denis & Schiffermuller, 1775)
Agrotis spinifera (Hübner, 1808)
Agrotis trux (Hübner, 1824)
Allophyes oxyacanthae (Linnaeus, 1758)
Amephana dalmatica (Rebel, 1919)
Ammoconia caecimacula (Denis & Schiffermuller, 1775)
Ammoconia senex (Geyer, 1828)
Amphipoea fucosa (Freyer, 1830)
Amphipoea oculea (Linnaeus, 1761)
Amphipyra berbera Rungs, 1949
Amphipyra effusa Boisduval, 1828
Amphipyra livida (Denis & Schiffermuller, 1775)
Amphipyra micans Lederer, 1857
Amphipyra perflua (Fabricius, 1787)
Amphipyra pyramidea (Linnaeus, 1758)
Amphipyra stix Herrich-Schäffer, 1850
Amphipyra tetra (Fabricius, 1787)
Amphipyra tragopoginis (Clerck, 1759)
Amphipyra cinnamomea (Goeze, 1781)
Anaplectoides prasina (Denis & Schiffermuller, 1775)
Anarta myrtilli (Linnaeus, 1761)
Anarta dianthi (Tauscher, 1809)
Anarta odontites (Boisduval, 1829)
Anarta trifolii (Hufnagel, 1766)
Anorthoa munda (Denis & Schiffermuller, 1775)
Anthracia eriopoda (Herrich-Schäffer, 1851)
Antitype chi (Linnaeus, 1758)
Antitype jonis (Lederer, 1865)
Antitype suda (Geyer, 1832)
Apamea anceps (Denis & Schiffermuller, 1775)
Apamea aquila Donzel, 1837
Apamea crenata (Hufnagel, 1766)
Apamea epomidion (Haworth, 1809)
Apamea furva (Denis & Schiffermuller, 1775)
Apamea illyria Freyer, 1846
Apamea lateritia (Hufnagel, 1766)
Apamea lithoxylaea (Denis & Schiffermuller, 1775)
Apamea maillardi (Geyer, 1834)
Apamea monoglypha (Hufnagel, 1766)
Apamea oblonga (Haworth, 1809)
Apamea platinea (Treitschke, 1825)
Apamea remissa (Hübner, 1809)
Apamea rubrirena (Treitschke, 1825)
Apamea scolopacina (Esper, 1788)
Apamea sordens (Hufnagel, 1766)
Apamea sublustris (Esper, 1788)
Apamea syriaca (Osthelder, 1933)
Apamea unanimis (Hübner, 1813)
Apamea zeta (Treitschke, 1825)
Apaustis rupicola (Denis & Schiffermuller, 1775)
Aporophyla australis (Boisduval, 1829)
Aporophyla canescens (Duponchel, 1826)
Aporophyla lutulenta (Denis & Schiffermuller, 1775)
Aporophyla nigra (Haworth, 1809)
Apterogenum ypsillon (Denis & Schiffermuller, 1775)
Archanara neurica (Hübner, 1808)
Asteroscopus sphinx (Hufnagel, 1766)
Asteroscopus syriaca (Warren, 1910)
Atethmia ambusta (Denis & Schiffermuller, 1775)
Atethmia centrago (Haworth, 1809)
Athetis furvula (Hübner, 1808)
Athetis gluteosa (Treitschke, 1835)
Athetis pallustris (Hübner, 1808)
Athetis lepigone (Moschler, 1860)
Atypha pulmonaris (Esper, 1790)
Auchmis detersa (Esper, 1787)
Autographa gamma (Linnaeus, 1758)
Autographa jota (Linnaeus, 1758)
Autographa pulchrina (Haworth, 1809)
Axylia putris (Linnaeus, 1761)
Behounekia freyeri (Frivaldszky, 1835)
Brachionycha nubeculosa (Esper, 1785)
Brachylomia viminalis (Fabricius, 1776)
Bryophila ereptricula Treitschke, 1825
Bryophila felina (Eversmann, 1852)
Bryophila orthogramma (Boursin, 1954)
Bryophila raptricula (Denis & Schiffermuller, 1775)
Bryophila ravula (Hübner, 1813)
Bryophila rectilinea (Warren, 1909)
Bryophila seladona Christoph, 1885
Bryophila tephrocharis (Boursin, 1953)
Bryophila domestica (Hufnagel, 1766)
Calamia tridens (Hufnagel, 1766)
Calliergis ramosa (Esper, 1786)
Callopistria juventina (Stoll, 1782)
Callopistria latreillei (Duponchel, 1827)
Calophasia lunula (Hufnagel, 1766)
Calophasia opalina (Esper, 1793)
Calophasia platyptera (Esper, 1788)
Caradrina morpheus (Hufnagel, 1766)
Caradrina gilva (Donzel, 1837)
Caradrina clavipalpis Scopoli, 1763
Caradrina flavirena Guenee, 1852
Caradrina selini Boisduval, 1840
Caradrina suscianja (Mentzer, 1981)
Caradrina wullschlegeli Pungeler, 1903
Caradrina aspersa Rambur, 1834
Caradrina kadenii Freyer, 1836
Caradrina terrea Freyer, 1840
Ceramica pisi (Linnaeus, 1758)
Cerapteryx graminis (Linnaeus, 1758)
Cerastis rubricosa (Denis & Schiffermuller, 1775)
Charanyca trigrammica (Hufnagel, 1766)
Charanyca apfelbecki (Rebel, 1901)
Charanyca ferruginea (Esper, 1785)
Chersotis cuprea (Denis & Schiffermuller, 1775)
Chersotis fimbriola (Esper, 1803)
Chersotis laeta (Rebel, 1904)
Chersotis margaritacea (Villers, 1789)
Chersotis multangula (Hübner, 1803)
Chilodes maritima (Tauscher, 1806)
Chloantha hyperici (Denis & Schiffermuller, 1775)
Chrysodeixis chalcites (Esper, 1789)
Cleoceris scoriacea (Esper, 1789)
Cleonymia opposita (Lederer, 1870)
Colocasia coryli (Linnaeus, 1758)
Condica viscosa (Freyer, 1831)
Conisania leineri (Freyer, 1836)
Conisania luteago (Denis & Schiffermuller, 1775)
Conistra ligula (Esper, 1791)
Conistra rubiginosa (Scopoli, 1763)
Conistra vaccinii (Linnaeus, 1761)
Conistra veronicae (Hübner, 1813)
Conistra erythrocephala (Denis & Schiffermuller, 1775)
Conistra rubiginea (Denis & Schiffermuller, 1775)
Conistra ragusae (Failla-Tedaldi, 1890)
Conistra torrida (Lederer, 1857)
Coranarta cordigera (Thunberg, 1788)
Cosmia trapezina (Linnaeus, 1758)
Cosmia pyralina (Denis & Schiffermuller, 1775)
Cosmia confinis Herrich-Schäffer, 1849
Cosmia affinis (Linnaeus, 1767)
Craniophora ligustri (Denis & Schiffermuller, 1775)
Craniophora pontica (Staudinger, 1878)
Cryphia fraudatricula (Hübner, 1803)
Cryphia receptricula (Hübner, 1803)
Cryphia algae (Fabricius, 1775)
Cryphia ochsi (Boursin, 1940)
Crypsedra gemmea (Treitschke, 1825)
Cucullia celsiae Herrich-Schäffer, 1850
Cucullia absinthii (Linnaeus, 1761)
Cucullia argentea (Hufnagel, 1766)
Cucullia artemisiae (Hufnagel, 1766)
Cucullia asteris (Denis & Schiffermuller, 1775)
Cucullia balsamitae Boisduval, 1840
Cucullia campanulae Freyer, 1831
Cucullia chamomillae (Denis & Schiffermuller, 1775)
Cucullia formosa Rogenhofer, 1860
Cucullia fraudatrix Eversmann, 1837
Cucullia lactucae (Denis & Schiffermuller, 1775)
Cucullia lucifuga (Denis & Schiffermuller, 1775)
Cucullia santonici (Hübner, 1813)
Cucullia scopariae Dorfmeister, 1853
Cucullia tanaceti (Denis & Schiffermuller, 1775)
Cucullia umbratica (Linnaeus, 1758)
Cucullia xeranthemi Boisduval, 1840
Cucullia blattariae (Esper, 1790)
Cucullia lanceolata (Villers, 1789)
Cucullia lychnitis Rambur, 1833
Cucullia prenanthis Boisduval, 1840
Cucullia scrophulariae (Denis & Schiffermuller, 1775)
Cucullia verbasci (Linnaeus, 1758)
Dasypolia ferdinandi Ruhl, 1892
Deltote bankiana (Fabricius, 1775)
Deltote deceptoria (Scopoli, 1763)
Deltote uncula (Clerck, 1759)
Deltote pygarga (Hufnagel, 1766)
Denticucullus pygmina (Haworth, 1809)
Diachrysia chrysitis (Linnaeus, 1758)
Diachrysia chryson (Esper, 1789)
Diachrysia nadeja (Oberthur, 1880)
Diachrysia zosimi (Hübner, 1822)
Diarsia mendica (Fabricius, 1775)
Diarsia rubi (Vieweg, 1790)
Dichagyris melanura (Kollar, 1846)
Dichagyris nigrescens (Hofner, 1888)
Dichagyris orientis (Alphéraky, 1882)
Dichonia aeruginea (Hübner, 1808)
Dichonia convergens (Denis & Schiffermuller, 1775)
Dicycla oo (Linnaeus, 1758)
Diloba caeruleocephala (Linnaeus, 1758)
Dioszeghyana schmidti (Dioszeghy, 1935)
Divaena haywardi (Tams, 1926)
Dryobota labecula (Esper, 1788)
Dryobotodes tenebrosa (Esper, 1789)
Dryobotodes carbonis Wagner, 1931
Dryobotodes eremita (Fabricius, 1775)
Dryobotodes monochroma (Esper, 1790)
Dypterygia scabriuscula (Linnaeus, 1758)
Egira conspicillaris (Linnaeus, 1758)
Elaphria venustula (Hübner, 1790)
Enargia abluta (Hübner, 1808)
Enterpia laudeti (Boisduval, 1840)
Epilecta linogrisea (Denis & Schiffermuller, 1775)
Epimecia ustula (Freyer, 1835)
Epipsilia cervantes (Reisser, 1935)
Episema glaucina (Esper, 1789)
Episema korsakovi (Christoph, 1885)
Episema lederi Christoph, 1885
Episema tersa (Denis & Schiffermuller, 1775)
Eremobia ochroleuca (Denis & Schiffermuller, 1775)
Eucarta amethystina (Hübner, 1803)
Eucarta virgo (Treitschke, 1835)
Euchalcia consona (Fabricius, 1787)
Euchalcia modestoides Poole, 1989
Eugnorisma depuncta (Linnaeus, 1761)
Eugraphe sigma (Denis & Schiffermuller, 1775)
Euplexia lucipara (Linnaeus, 1758)
Eupsilia transversa (Hufnagel, 1766)
Euxoa birivia (Denis & Schiffermuller, 1775)
Euxoa cos (Hübner, 1824)
Euxoa decora (Denis & Schiffermuller, 1775)
Euxoa nigricans (Linnaeus, 1761)
Euxoa nigrofusca (Esper, 1788)
Euxoa obelisca (Denis & Schiffermuller, 1775)
Euxoa recussa (Hübner, 1817)
Euxoa temera (Hübner, 1808)
Evisa schawerdae Reisser, 1930
Globia algae (Esper, 1789)
Gortyna borelii Pierret, 1837
Gortyna flavago (Denis & Schiffermuller, 1775)
Gortyna puengeleri (Turati, 1909)
Graphiphora augur (Fabricius, 1775)
Griposia aprilina (Linnaeus, 1758)
Hada plebeja (Linnaeus, 1761)
Hadena irregularis (Hufnagel, 1766)
Hadena perplexa (Denis & Schiffermuller, 1775)
Hadena silenes (Hübner, 1822)
Hadena syriaca (Osthelder, 1933)
Hadena adriana (Schawerda, 1921)
Hadena albimacula (Borkhausen, 1792)
Hadena caesia (Denis & Schiffermuller, 1775)
Hadena capsincola (Denis & Schiffermuller, 1775)
Hadena clara (Staudinger, 1901)
Hadena compta (Denis & Schiffermuller, 1775)
Hadena confusa (Hufnagel, 1766)
Hadena drenowskii (Rebel, 1930)
Hadena filograna (Esper, 1788)
Hadena gueneei (Staudinger, 1901)
Hadena luteocincta (Rambur, 1834)
Hadena magnolii (Boisduval, 1829)
Hadena vulcanica (Turati, 1907)
Haemerosia renalis (Hübner, 1813)
Hecatera bicolorata (Hufnagel, 1766)
Hecatera cappa (Hübner, 1809)
Hecatera dysodea (Denis & Schiffermuller, 1775)
Helicoverpa armigera (Hübner, 1808)
Heliothis incarnata Freyer, 1838
Heliothis maritima Graslin, 1855
Heliothis nubigera Herrich-Schäffer, 1851
Heliothis ononis (Denis & Schiffermuller, 1775)
Heliothis peltigera (Denis & Schiffermuller, 1775)
Heliothis viriplaca (Hufnagel, 1766)
Helivictoria victorina (Sodoffsky, 1849)
Hoplodrina ambigua (Denis & Schiffermuller, 1775)
Hoplodrina blanda (Denis & Schiffermuller, 1775)
Hoplodrina octogenaria (Goeze, 1781)
Hoplodrina respersa (Denis & Schiffermuller, 1775)
Hoplodrina superstes (Ochsenheimer, 1816)
Hydraecia micacea (Esper, 1789)
Hydraecia petasitis Doubleday, 1847
Hyppa rectilinea (Esper, 1788)
Ipimorpha retusa (Linnaeus, 1761)
Ipimorpha subtusa (Denis & Schiffermuller, 1775)
Janthinea friwaldskii (Duponchel, 1835)
Jodia croceago (Denis & Schiffermuller, 1775)
Lacanobia contigua (Denis & Schiffermuller, 1775)
Lacanobia suasa (Denis & Schiffermuller, 1775)
Lacanobia thalassina (Hufnagel, 1766)
Lacanobia aliena (Hübner, 1809)
Lacanobia blenna (Hübner, 1824)
Lacanobia oleracea (Linnaeus, 1758)
Lacanobia splendens (Hübner, 1808)
Lacanobia w-latinum (Hufnagel, 1766)
Lamprotes c-aureum (Knoch, 1781)
Lasionycta proxima (Hübner, 1809)
Lateroligia ophiogramma (Esper, 1794)
Lenisa geminipuncta (Haworth, 1809)
Leucania loreyi (Duponchel, 1827)
Leucania comma (Linnaeus, 1761)
Leucania obsoleta (Hübner, 1803)
Leucania punctosa (Treitschke, 1825)
Leucania putrescens (Hübner, 1824)
Leucania zeae (Duponchel, 1827)
Lithophane furcifera (Hufnagel, 1766)
Lithophane ledereri (Staudinger, 1892)
Lithophane merckii (Rambur, 1832)
Lithophane ornitopus (Hufnagel, 1766)
Lithophane semibrunnea (Haworth, 1809)
Lithophane socia (Hufnagel, 1766)
Lithophane lapidea (Hübner, 1808)
Litoligia literosa (Haworth, 1809)
Luperina dumerilii (Duponchel, 1826)
Luperina nickerlii (Freyer, 1845)
Luperina rubella (Duponchel, 1835)
Luperina testacea (Denis & Schiffermuller, 1775)
Lycophotia erythrina (Herrich-Schäffer, 1852)
Macdunnoughia confusa (Stephens, 1850)
Mamestra brassicae (Linnaeus, 1758)
Maraschia grisescens Osthelder, 1933
Meganephria bimaculosa (Linnaeus, 1767)
Mesapamea secalella Remm, 1983
Mesapamea secalis (Linnaeus, 1758)
Mesogona acetosellae (Denis & Schiffermuller, 1775)
Mesoligia furuncula (Denis & Schiffermuller, 1775)
Mesotrosta signalis (Treitschke, 1829)
Mniotype adusta (Esper, 1790)
Mniotype satura (Denis & Schiffermuller, 1775)
Mniotype solieri (Boisduval, 1829)
Moma alpium (Osbeck, 1778)
Mormo maura (Linnaeus, 1758)
Mythimna riparia (Rambur, 1829)
Mythimna albipuncta (Denis & Schiffermuller, 1775)
Mythimna congrua (Hübner, 1817)
Mythimna ferrago (Fabricius, 1787)
Mythimna l-album (Linnaeus, 1767)
Mythimna conigera (Denis & Schiffermuller, 1775)
Mythimna impura (Hübner, 1808)
Mythimna pallens (Linnaeus, 1758)
Mythimna pudorina (Denis & Schiffermuller, 1775)
Mythimna straminea (Treitschke, 1825)
Mythimna turca (Linnaeus, 1761)
Mythimna vitellina (Hübner, 1808)
Mythimna alopecuri (Boisduval, 1840)
Mythimna andereggii (Boisduval, 1840)
Mythimna sicula (Treitschke, 1835)
Naenia typica (Linnaeus, 1758)
Noctua comes Hübner, 1813
Noctua fimbriata (Schreber, 1759)
Noctua interjecta Hübner, 1803
Noctua interposita (Hübner, 1790)
Noctua janthina Denis & Schiffermuller, 1775
Noctua orbona (Hufnagel, 1766)
Noctua pronuba (Linnaeus, 1758)
Noctua tertia Mentzer & al., 1991
Noctua tirrenica Biebinger, Speidel & Hanigk, 1983
Nyctobrya amasina Draudt, 1931
Nyctobrya muralis (Forster, 1771)
Ochropleura leucogaster (Freyer, 1831)
Ochropleura plecta (Linnaeus, 1761)
Oligia fasciuncula (Haworth, 1809)
Oligia latruncula (Denis & Schiffermuller, 1775)
Oligia strigilis (Linnaeus, 1758)
Oligia versicolor (Borkhausen, 1792)
Olivenebula subsericata (Herrich-Schäffer, 1861)
Omia cymbalariae (Hübner, 1809)
Omphalophana anatolica (Lederer, 1857)
Omphalophana antirrhinii (Hübner, 1803)
Opigena polygona (Denis & Schiffermuller, 1775)
Oria musculosa (Hübner, 1808)
Orthosia gracilis (Denis & Schiffermuller, 1775)
Orthosia opima (Hübner, 1809)
Orthosia cerasi (Fabricius, 1775)
Orthosia cruda (Denis & Schiffermuller, 1775)
Orthosia dalmatica (Wagner, 1909)
Orthosia miniosa (Denis & Schiffermuller, 1775)
Orthosia populeti (Fabricius, 1775)
Orthosia incerta (Hufnagel, 1766)
Orthosia gothica (Linnaeus, 1758)
Oxicesta chamoenices (Herrich-Schäffer, 1845)
Oxicesta geographica (Fabricius, 1787)
Oxytripia orbiculosa (Esper, 1799)
Pachetra sagittigera (Hufnagel, 1766)
Panchrysia aurea (Hübner, 1803)
Panchrysia v-argenteum (Esper, 1798)
Panemeria tenebrata (Scopoli, 1763)
Panolis flammea (Denis & Schiffermuller, 1775)
Panthea coenobita (Esper, 1785)
Papestra biren (Goeze, 1781)
Parastichtis suspecta (Hübner, 1817)
Peridroma saucia (Hübner, 1808)
Perigrapha i-cinctum (Denis & Schiffermuller, 1775)
Perigrapha rorida Frivaldszky, 1835
Periphanes delphinii (Linnaeus, 1758)
Philareta treitschkei (Frivaldszky, 1835)
Phlogophora meticulosa (Linnaeus, 1758)
Phlogophora scita (Hübner, 1790)
Photedes captiuncula (Treitschke, 1825)
Photedes extrema (Hübner, 1809)
Photedes minima (Haworth, 1809)
Photedes morrisii (Dale, 1837)
Phyllophila obliterata (Rambur, 1833)
Plusidia cheiranthi (Tauscher, 1809)
Polia bombycina (Hufnagel, 1766)
Polia nebulosa (Hufnagel, 1766)
Polychrysia moneta (Fabricius, 1787)
Polymixis culoti (Schawerda, 1921)
Polymixis flavicincta (Denis & Schiffermuller, 1775)
Polymixis polymita (Linnaeus, 1761)
Polymixis rufocincta (Geyer, 1828)
Polymixis serpentina (Treitschke, 1825)
Polyphaenis sericata (Esper, 1787)
Praestilbia armeniaca Staudinger, 1892
Protoschinia scutosa (Denis & Schiffermuller, 1775)
Pseudeustrotia candidula (Denis & Schiffermuller, 1775)
Pseudluperina pozzii (Curo, 1883)
Pyrrhia purpura (Hübner, 1817)
Pyrrhia umbra (Hufnagel, 1766)
Rhizedra lutosa (Hübner, 1803)
Rhyacia lucipeta (Denis & Schiffermuller, 1775)
Rhyacia simulans (Hufnagel, 1766)
Rileyiana fovea (Treitschke, 1825)
Schinia cardui (Hübner, 1790)
Schinia cognata (Freyer, 1833)
Scotochrosta pulla (Denis & Schiffermuller, 1775)
Sesamia cretica Lederer, 1857
Sesamia nonagrioides Lefebvre, 1827
Sideridis rivularis (Fabricius, 1775)
Sideridis implexa (Hübner, 1809)
Sideridis kitti (Schawerda, 1914)
Sideridis reticulata (Goeze, 1781)
Sideridis lampra (Schawerda, 1913)
Sideridis turbida (Esper, 1790)
Simyra albovenosa (Goeze, 1781)
Simyra dentinosa Freyer, 1838
Simyra nervosa (Denis & Schiffermuller, 1775)
Spaelotis ravida (Denis & Schiffermuller, 1775)
Spaelotis senna (Freyer, 1829)
Spodoptera exigua (Hübner, 1808)
Standfussiana dalmata (Staudinger, 1901)
Stenoecia dos (Freyer, 1838)
Subacronicta megacephala (Denis & Schiffermuller, 1775)
Syngrapha devergens (Hübner, 1813)
Synthymia fixa (Fabricius, 1787)
Teinoptera lunaki (Boursin, 1940)
Teinoptera olivina (Herrich-Schäffer, 1852)
Thalpophila matura (Hufnagel, 1766)
Tholera cespitis (Denis & Schiffermuller, 1775)
Tholera decimalis (Poda, 1761)
Thysanoplusia orichalcea (Fabricius, 1775)
Tiliacea aurago (Denis & Schiffermuller, 1775)
Tiliacea citrago (Linnaeus, 1758)
Tiliacea cypreago (Hampson, 1906)
Tiliacea sulphurago (Denis & Schiffermuller, 1775)
Trachea atriplicis (Linnaeus, 1758)
Trichoplusia ni (Hübner, 1803)
Trichosea ludifica (Linnaeus, 1758)
Trigonophora flammea (Esper, 1785)
Tyta luctuosa (Denis & Schiffermuller, 1775)
Ulochlaena hirta (Hübner, 1813)
Valeria jaspidea (Villers, 1789)
Valeria oleagina (Denis & Schiffermuller, 1775)
Xanthia gilvago (Denis & Schiffermuller, 1775)
Xanthia icteritia (Hufnagel, 1766)
Xanthia ocellaris (Borkhausen, 1792)
Xanthia castanea Osthelder, 1933
Xanthia togata (Esper, 1788)
Xestia ashworthii (Doubleday, 1855)
Xestia c-nigrum (Linnaeus, 1758)
Xestia ditrapezium (Denis & Schiffermuller, 1775)
Xestia triangulum (Hufnagel, 1766)
Xestia speciosa (Hübner, 1813)
Xestia baja (Denis & Schiffermuller, 1775)
Xestia castanea (Esper, 1798)
Xestia cohaesa (Herrich-Schäffer, 1849)
Xestia collina (Boisduval, 1840)
Xestia ochreago (Hübner, 1809)
Xestia stigmatica (Hübner, 1813)
Xestia xanthographa (Denis & Schiffermuller, 1775)
Xylena exsoleta (Linnaeus, 1758)
Xylena lunifera Warren, 1910
Xylena vetusta (Hübner, 1813)

Nolidae
Bena bicolorana (Fuessly, 1775)
Earias clorana (Linnaeus, 1761)
Earias vernana (Fabricius, 1787)
Meganola albula (Denis & Schiffermuller, 1775)
Meganola strigula (Denis & Schiffermuller, 1775)
Meganola togatulalis (Hübner, 1796)
Nola confusalis (Herrich-Schäffer, 1847)
Nola cristatula (Hübner, 1793)
Nola cucullatella (Linnaeus, 1758)
Nola subchlamydula Staudinger, 1871
Nycteola asiatica (Krulikovsky, 1904)
Nycteola columbana (Turner, 1925)
Nycteola revayana (Scopoli, 1772)
Nycteola siculana (Fuchs, 1899)
Pseudoips prasinana (Linnaeus, 1758)

Notodontidae
Cerura erminea (Esper, 1783)
Cerura vinula (Linnaeus, 1758)
Clostera anachoreta (Denis & Schiffermuller, 1775)
Clostera anastomosis (Linnaeus, 1758)
Clostera curtula (Linnaeus, 1758)
Clostera pigra (Hufnagel, 1766)
Dicranura ulmi (Denis & Schiffermuller, 1775)
Drymonia dodonaea (Denis & Schiffermuller, 1775)
Drymonia querna (Denis & Schiffermuller, 1775)
Drymonia ruficornis (Hufnagel, 1766)
Furcula bicuspis (Borkhausen, 1790)
Furcula bifida (Brahm, 1787)
Furcula furcula (Clerck, 1759)
Harpyia milhauseri (Fabricius, 1775)
Notodonta dromedarius (Linnaeus, 1767)
Notodonta tritophus (Denis & Schiffermuller, 1775)
Notodonta ziczac (Linnaeus, 1758)
Paradrymonia vittata (Staudinger, 1892)
Peridea anceps (Goeze, 1781)
Phalera bucephala (Linnaeus, 1758)
Phalera bucephaloides (Ochsenheimer, 1810)
Pheosia gnoma (Fabricius, 1776)
Pheosia tremula (Clerck, 1759)
Pterostoma palpina (Clerck, 1759)
Ptilodon capucina (Linnaeus, 1758)
Ptilodon cucullina (Denis & Schiffermuller, 1775)
Spatalia argentina (Denis & Schiffermuller, 1775)
Stauropus fagi (Linnaeus, 1758)
Thaumetopoea pityocampa (Denis & Schiffermuller, 1775)
Thaumetopoea processionea (Linnaeus, 1758)
Thaumetopoea solitaria (Freyer, 1838)

Oecophoridae
Alabonia geoffrella (Linnaeus, 1767)
Alabonia staintoniella (Zeller, 1850)
Batia lunaris (Haworth, 1828)
Borkhausenia minutella (Linnaeus, 1758)
Crassa tinctella (Hübner, 1796)
Dasycera oliviella (Fabricius, 1794)
Denisia augustella (Hübner, 1796)
Denisia stipella (Linnaeus, 1758)
Endrosis sarcitrella (Linnaeus, 1758)
Epicallima formosella (Denis & Schiffermuller, 1775)
Epicallima icterinella (Mann, 1867)
Harpella forficella (Scopoli, 1763)
Holoscolia huebneri Kocak, 1980
Kasyniana diminutella (Rebel, 1931)
Minetia criella (Treitschke, 1835)
Oecophora bractella (Linnaeus, 1758)
Pleurota marginella (Denis & Schiffermuller, 1775)
Pleurota aristella (Linnaeus, 1767)
Pleurota bicostella (Clerck, 1759)
Pleurota filigerella Mann, 1867
Pleurota pungitiella Herrich-Schäffer, 1854
Pleurota pyropella (Denis & Schiffermuller, 1775)
Pleurota punctella (O. Costa, 1836)
Schiffermuelleria schaefferella (Linnaeus, 1758)

Opostegidae
Opostega salaciella (Treitschke, 1833)
Pseudopostega crepusculella (Zeller, 1839)

Peleopodidae
Carcina quercana (Fabricius, 1775)

Plutellidae
Eidophasia messingiella (Fischer von Röslerstamm, 1840)
Eidophasia syenitella Herrich-Schäffer, 1854
Plutella xylostella (Linnaeus, 1758)
Plutella porrectella (Linnaeus, 1758)
Rhigognostis hufnagelii (Zeller, 1839)

Praydidae
Prays oleae (Bernard, 1788)

Psychidae
Acanthopsyche zelleri (Mann, 1855)
Anaproutia comitella (Bruand, 1853)
Anaproutia reticulatella (Bruand, 1853)
Bijugis bombycella (Denis & Schiffermuller, 1775)
Brevantennia adriatica (Rebel, 1919)
Canephora hirsuta (Poda, 1761)
Dahlica triquetrella (Hübner, 1813)
Diplodoma laichartingella Goeze, 1783
Eumasia parietariella (Heydenreich, 1851)
Narycia duplicella (Goeze, 1783)
Pachythelia villosella (Ochsenheimer, 1810)
Psyche casta (Pallas, 1767)
Psyche crassiorella Bruand, 1851
Ptilocephala biroi (Rebel, 1909)
Rebelia perlucidella (Bruand, 1853)
Rebelia sapho (Milliere, 1864)
Taleporia autumnella Rebel, 1919
Taleporia politella (Ochsenheimer, 1816)
Taleporia tubulosa (Retzius, 1783)

Pterophoridae
Adaina microdactyla (Hübner, 1813)
Agdistis bennetii (Curtis, 1833)
Agdistis meridionalis (Zeller, 1847)
Agdistis tamaricis (Zeller, 1847)
Amblyptilia acanthadactyla (Hübner, 1813)
Calyciphora albodactylus (Fabricius, 1794)
Calyciphora homoiodactyla (Kasy, 1960)
Capperia celeusi (Frey, 1886)
Capperia fusca (O. Hofmann, 1898)
Capperia hellenica Adamczewski, 1951
Capperia maratonica Adamczewski, 1951
Capperia polonica Adamczewski, 1951
Cnaemidophorus rhododactyla (Denis & Schiffermuller, 1775)
Crombrugghia distans (Zeller, 1847)
Crombrugghia laetus (Zeller, 1847)
Crombrugghia tristis (Zeller, 1841)
Emmelina monodactyla (Linnaeus, 1758)
Gillmeria ochrodactyla (Denis & Schiffermuller, 1775)
Gypsochares baptodactylus (Zeller, 1850)
Hellinsia carphodactyla (Hübner, 1813)
Hellinsia inulae (Zeller, 1852)
Hellinsia lienigianus (Zeller, 1852)
Hellinsia osteodactylus (Zeller, 1841)
Merrifieldia baliodactylus (Zeller, 1841)
Merrifieldia leucodactyla (Denis & Schiffermuller, 1775)
Merrifieldia malacodactylus (Zeller, 1847)
Merrifieldia tridactyla (Linnaeus, 1758)
Oidaematophorus lithodactyla (Treitschke, 1833)
Oxyptilus parvidactyla (Haworth, 1811)
Oxyptilus pilosellae (Zeller, 1841)
Paraplatyptilia metzneri (Zeller, 1841)
Platyptilia calodactyla (Denis & Schiffermuller, 1775)
Platyptilia gonodactyla (Denis & Schiffermuller, 1775)
Procapperia linariae (Chretien, 1922)
Pselnophorus heterodactyla (Muller, 1764)
Pterophorus ischnodactyla (Treitschke, 1835)
Pterophorus pentadactyla (Linnaeus, 1758)
Stangeia siceliota (Zeller, 1847)
Stenoptilia aridus (Zeller, 1847)
Stenoptilia bipunctidactyla (Scopoli, 1763)
Stenoptilia pterodactyla (Linnaeus, 1761)
Stenoptilia stigmatodactylus (Zeller, 1852)
Stenoptilia zophodactylus (Duponchel, 1840)
Wheeleria obsoletus (Zeller, 1841)

Pyralidae
Achroia grisella (Fabricius, 1794)
Acrobasis advenella (Zincken, 1818)
Acrobasis bithynella Zeller, 1848
Acrobasis centunculella (Mann, 1859)
Acrobasis consociella (Hübner, 1813)
Acrobasis dulcella (Zeller, 1848)
Acrobasis getuliella (Zerny, 1914)
Acrobasis glaucella Staudinger, 1859
Acrobasis legatea (Haworth, 1811)
Acrobasis marmorea (Haworth, 1811)
Acrobasis obliqua (Zeller, 1847)
Acrobasis obtusella (Hübner, 1796)
Acrobasis porphyrella (Duponchel, 1836)
Acrobasis repandana (Fabricius, 1798)
Acrobasis sodalella Zeller, 1848
Acrobasis suavella (Zincken, 1818)
Acrobasis tumidana (Denis & Schiffermuller, 1775)
Aglossa caprealis (Hübner, 1809)
Aglossa pinguinalis (Linnaeus, 1758)
Alophia combustella (Herrich-Schäffer, 1855)
Amphithrix sublineatella (Staudinger, 1859)
Ancylodes pallens Ragonot, 1887
Ancylosis cinnamomella (Duponchel, 1836)
Ancylosis oblitella (Zeller, 1848)
Ancylosis roscidella (Eversmann, 1844)
Ancylosis sareptalla (Herrich-Schäffer, 1861)
Anerastia lotella (Hübner, 1813)
Aphomia sociella (Linnaeus, 1758)
Aphomia zelleri de Joannis, 1932
Apomyelois ceratoniae (Zeller, 1839)
Asalebria florella (Mann, 1862)
Bostra obsoletalis (Mann, 1884)
Bradyrrhoa cantenerella (Duponchel, 1837)
Bradyrrhoa confiniella Zeller, 1848
Bradyrrhoa trapezella (Duponchel, 1836)
Cadra abstersella (Zeller, 1847)
Cadra cautella (Walker, 1863)
Cadra figulilella (Gregson, 1871)
Cadra furcatella (Herrich-Schäffer, 1849)
Catastia marginea (Denis & Schiffermuller, 1775)
Cryptoblabes bistriga (Haworth, 1811)
Dectocera pseudolimbella Ragonot, 1887
Delplanqueia dilutella (Denis & Schiffermuller, 1775)
Denticera divisella (Duponchel, 1842)
Dioryctria abietella (Denis & Schiffermuller, 1775)
Dioryctria mendacella (Staudinger, 1859)
Dioryctria pineae (Staudinger, 1859)
Dioryctria robiniella (Milliere, 1865)
Dioryctria sylvestrella (Ratzeburg, 1840)
Eccopisa effractella Zeller, 1848
Elegia fallax (Staudinger, 1881)
Elegia similella (Zincken, 1818)
Ematheudes punctella (Treitschke, 1833)
Endotricha flammealis (Denis & Schiffermuller, 1775)
Ephestia disparella Hampson, 1901
Ephestia elutella (Hübner, 1796)
Ephestia parasitella Staudinger, 1859
Ephestia unicolorella Staudinger, 1881
Ephestia welseriella (Zeller, 1848)
Epidauria strigosa (Staudinger, 1879)
Epidauria transversariella (Zeller, 1848)
Epischnia cretaciella Mann, 1869
Epischnia illotella Zeller, 1839
Epischnia leucoloma Herrich-Schäffer, 1849
Epischnia prodromella (Hübner, 1799)
Episcythrastis tetricella (Denis & Schiffermuller, 1775)
Etiella zinckenella (Treitschke, 1832)
Eucarphia vinetella (Fabricius, 1787)
Eurhodope cirrigerella (Zincken, 1818)
Eurhodope rosella (Scopoli, 1763)
Euzophera bigella (Zeller, 1848)
Euzophera cinerosella (Zeller, 1839)
Euzophera osseatella (Treitschke, 1832)
Euzopherodes lutisignella (Mann, 1869)
Euzopherodes vapidella (Mann, 1857)
Galleria mellonella (Linnaeus, 1758)
Glyptoteles leucacrinella Zeller, 1848
Gymnancyla canella (Denis & Schiffermuller, 1775)
Gymnancyla hornigii (Lederer, 1852)
Homoeosoma gravosellum Roesler, 1965
Homoeosoma nebulella (Denis & Schiffermuller, 1775)
Homoeosoma nimbella (Duponchel, 1837)
Homoeosoma sinuella (Fabricius, 1794)
Hypochalcia ahenella (Denis & Schiffermuller, 1775)
Hypochalcia decorella (Hübner, 1810)
Hypochalcia lignella (Hübner, 1796)
Hypotia corticalis (Denis & Schiffermuller, 1775)
Hypotia massilialis (Duponchel, 1832)
Hypsopygia costalis (Fabricius, 1775)
Hypsopygia fulvocilialis (Duponchel, 1834)
Hypsopygia glaucinalis (Linnaeus, 1758)
Hypsopygia incarnatalis (Zeller, 1847)
Hypsopygia rubidalis (Denis & Schiffermuller, 1775)
Hypsotropa limbella Zeller, 1848
Hypsotropa vulneratella (Zeller, 1847)
Insalebria serraticornella (Zeller, 1839)
Isauria dilucidella (Duponchel, 1836)
Khorassania compositella (Treitschke, 1835)
Lamoria anella (Denis & Schiffermuller, 1775)
Matilella fusca (Haworth, 1811)
Merulempista cingillella (Zeller, 1846)
Metallostichodes nigrocyanella (Constant, 1865)
Moitrelia obductella (Zeller, 1839)
Myelois circumvoluta (Fourcroy, 1785)
Nephopterix angustella (Hübner, 1796)
Nyctegretis lineana (Scopoli, 1786)
Oncocera semirubella (Scopoli, 1763)
Oxybia transversella (Duponchel, 1836)
Pempelia albariella Zeller, 1839
Pempelia amoenella (Zeller, 1848)
Pempelia palumbella (Denis & Schiffermuller, 1775)
Pempeliella ornatella (Denis & Schiffermuller, 1775)
Pempeliella sororiella Zeller, 1839
Phycita coronatella (Guenee, 1845)
Phycita meliella (Mann, 1864)
Phycita metzneri (Zeller, 1846)
Phycita poteriella (Zeller, 1846)
Phycita roborella (Denis & Schiffermuller, 1775)
Phycitodes binaevella (Hübner, 1813)
Plodia interpunctella (Hübner, 1813)
Psorosa dahliella (Treitschke, 1832)
Psorosa mediterranella Amsel, 1953
Psorosa tergestella Ragonot, 1901
Pterothrixidia rufella (Duponchel, 1836)
Pyralis farinalis (Linnaeus, 1758)
Pyralis regalis Denis & Schiffermuller, 1775
Rhodophaea formosa (Haworth, 1811)
Sciota insignella (Mann, 1862)
Selagia argyrella (Denis & Schiffermuller, 1775)
Selagia spadicella (Hübner, 1796)
Seleucia pectinella (Chretien, 1911)
Seleucia semirosella Ragonot, 1887
Stemmatophora brunnealis (Treitschke, 1829)
Stemmatophora combustalis (Fischer v. Röslerstamm, 1842)
Stemmatophora honestalis (Treitschke, 1829)
Synaphe antennalis (Fabricius, 1794)
Synaphe moldavica (Esper, 1794)
Synaphe punctalis (Fabricius, 1775)
Trachonitis cristella (Denis & Schiffermuller, 1775)
Valdovecaria umbratella (Treitschke, 1832)
Vitula biviella (Zeller, 1848)

Saturniidae
Aglia tau (Linnaeus, 1758)
Antheraea yamamai (Guerin-Meneville, 1861)
Samia cynthia (Drury, 1773)
Saturnia pavoniella (Scopoli, 1763)
Saturnia spini (Denis & Schiffermuller, 1775)
Saturnia caecigena Kupido, 1825
Saturnia pyri (Denis & Schiffermuller, 1775)

Scythrididae
Enolmis desidella (Lederer, 1855)
Scythris albidella (Stainton, 1867)
Scythris crypta Hannemann, 1961
Scythris cuspidella (Denis & Schiffermuller, 1775)
Scythris disparella (Tengstrom, 1848)
Scythris dissimilella (Herrich-Schäffer, 1855)
Scythris ericetella (Heinemann, 1872)
Scythris hornigii (Zeller, 1855)
Scythris hungaricella Rebel, 1917
Scythris laminella (Denis & Schiffermuller, 1775)
Scythris moldavicella Caradja, 1905
Scythris oelandicella Muller-Rutz, 1922
Scythris productella (Zeller, 1839)
Scythris ridiculella Caradja, 1920
Scythris schleichiella (Zeller, 1870)
Scythris subschleichiella Hannemann, 1961
Scythris tabidella (Herrich-Schäffer, 1855)
Scythris vittella (O. Costa, 1834)

Sesiidae
Bembecia albanensis (Rebel, 1918)
Bembecia himmighoffeni (Staudinger, 1866)
Bembecia ichneumoniformis (Denis & Schiffermuller, 1775)
Bembecia megillaeformis (Hübner, 1813)
Bembecia pavicevici Tosevski, 1989
Bembecia scopigera (Scopoli, 1763)
Bembecia uroceriformis (Treitschke, 1834)
Chamaesphecia aerifrons (Zeller, 1847)
Chamaesphecia alysoniformis (Herrich-Schäffer, 1846)
Chamaesphecia annellata (Zeller, 1847)
Chamaesphecia astatiformis (Herrich-Schäffer, 1846)
Chamaesphecia bibioniformis (Esper, 1800)
Chamaesphecia chalciformis (Esper, 1804)
Chamaesphecia doleriformis (Herrich-Schäffer, 1846)
Chamaesphecia dumonti Le Cerf, 1922
Chamaesphecia empiformis (Esper, 1783)
Chamaesphecia euceraeformis (Ochsenheimer, 1816)
Chamaesphecia hungarica (Tomala, 1901)
Chamaesphecia leucopsiformis (Esper, 1800)
Chamaesphecia masariformis (Ochsenheimer, 1808)
Chamaesphecia nigrifrons (Le Cerf, 1911)
Chamaesphecia palustris Kautz, 1927
Chamaesphecia schmidtiiformis (Freyer, 1836)
Chamaesphecia tenthrediniformis (Denis & Schiffermuller, 1775)
Paranthrene diaphana Dalla Torre & Strand, 1925
Paranthrene insolitus Le Cerf, 1914
Paranthrene tabaniformis (Rottemburg, 1775)
Pennisetia hylaeiformis (Laspeyres, 1801)
Pyropteron affinis (Staudinger, 1856)
Pyropteron chrysidiformis (Esper, 1782)
Pyropteron leucomelaena (Zeller, 1847)
Pyropteron muscaeformis (Esper, 1783)
Pyropteron triannuliformis (Freyer, 1843)
Sesia apiformis (Clerck, 1759)
Sesia melanocephala Dalman, 1816
Synanthedon andrenaeformis (Laspeyres, 1801)
Synanthedon cephiformis (Ochsenheimer, 1808)
Synanthedon conopiformis (Esper, 1782)
Synanthedon culiciformis (Linnaeus, 1758)
Synanthedon flaviventris (Staudinger, 1883)
Synanthedon formicaeformis (Esper, 1783)
Synanthedon loranthi (Kralicek, 1966)
Synanthedon melliniformis (Laspeyres, 1801)
Synanthedon myopaeformis (Borkhausen, 1789)
Synanthedon spheciformis (Denis & Schiffermuller, 1775)
Synanthedon spuleri (Fuchs, 1908)
Synanthedon stomoxiformis (Hübner, 1790)
Synanthedon tipuliformis (Clerck, 1759)
Synanthedon vespiformis (Linnaeus, 1761)
Tinthia brosiformis (Hübner, 1813)
Tinthia tineiformis (Esper, 1789)

Sphingidae
Acherontia atropos (Linnaeus, 1758)
Agrius convolvuli (Linnaeus, 1758)
Daphnis nerii (Linnaeus, 1758)
Deilephila elpenor (Linnaeus, 1758)
Deilephila porcellus (Linnaeus, 1758)
Hemaris croatica (Esper, 1800)
Hemaris fuciformis (Linnaeus, 1758)
Hemaris tityus (Linnaeus, 1758)
Hippotion celerio (Linnaeus, 1758)
Hyles euphorbiae (Linnaeus, 1758)
Hyles hippophaes (Esper, 1789)
Hyles livornica (Esper, 1780)
Hyles vespertilio (Esper, 1780)
Laothoe populi (Linnaeus, 1758)
Macroglossum stellatarum (Linnaeus, 1758)
Marumba quercus (Denis & Schiffermuller, 1775)
Mimas tiliae (Linnaeus, 1758)
Proserpinus proserpina (Pallas, 1772)
Smerinthus ocellata (Linnaeus, 1758)
Sphingoneopsis gorgoniades (Hübner, 1819)
Sphinx ligustri Linnaeus, 1758
Sphinx pinastri Linnaeus, 1758

Thyrididae
Thyris fenestrella (Scopoli, 1763)

Tineidae
Anomalotinea gardesanella (Hartig, 1950)
Anomalotinea liguriella (Milliere, 1879)
Ateliotum hungaricellum Zeller, 1839
Cephimallota angusticostella (Zeller, 1839)
Cephimallota crassiflavella Bruand, 1851
Ceratuncus danubiella (Mann, 1866)
Eudarcia nigraella (Mariani, 1937)
Eudarcia confusella (Heydenreich, 1851)
Eudarcia croaticum (Petersen, 1962)
Eudarcia granulatella (Zeller, 1852)
Euplocamus anthracinalis (Scopoli, 1763)
Infurcitinea albicomella (Stainton, 1851)
Infurcitinea banatica Petersen, 1961
Infurcitinea captans Gozmany, 1960
Infurcitinea finalis Gozmany, 1959
Infurcitinea nedae Gaedike, 1983
Infurcitinea rebeliella (Krone, 1907)
Ischnoscia borreonella (Milliere, 1874)
Lichenotinea pustulatella (Zeller, 1852)
Monopis crocicapitella (Clemens, 1859)
Monopis imella (Hübner, 1813)
Monopis laevigella (Denis & Schiffermuller, 1775)
Monopis obviella (Denis & Schiffermuller, 1775)
Montetinea tenuicornella (Klimesch, 1942)
Morophaga choragella (Denis & Schiffermuller, 1775)
Morophaga morella (Duponchel, 1838)
Nemapogon clematella (Fabricius, 1781)
Nemapogon cloacella (Haworth, 1828)
Nemapogon falstriella (Bang-Haas, 1881)
Nemapogon granella (Linnaeus, 1758)
Nemapogon gravosaellus Petersen, 1957
Nemapogon hungaricus Gozmany, 1960
Nemapogon inconditella (Lucas, 1956)
Nemapogon nigralbella (Zeller, 1839)
Nemapogon signatellus Petersen, 1957
Nemapogon variatella (Clemens, 1859)
Nemapogon wolffiella Karsholt & Nielsen, 1976
Neurothaumasia ankerella (Mann, 1867)
Neurothaumasia macedonica Petersen, 1962
Niditinea fuscella (Linnaeus, 1758)
Novotinea klimeschi (Rebel, 1940)
Proterospastis merdella (Zeller, 1847)
Reisserita relicinella (Herrich-Schäffer, 1853)
Scardia boletella (Fabricius, 1794)
Tenaga nigripunctella (Haworth, 1828)
Tenaga rhenania (Petersen, 1962)
Tinea basifasciella Ragonot, 1895
Tinea dubiella Stainton, 1859
Tinea flavescentella Haworth, 1828
Tinea nonimella (Zagulajev, 1955)
Tinea pellionella Linnaeus, 1758
Tinea translucens Meyrick, 1917
Tinea trinotella Thunberg, 1794
Tineola bisselliella (Hummel, 1823)
Triaxomasia caprimulgella (Stainton, 1851)
Triaxomera fulvimitrella (Sodoffsky, 1830)
Triaxomera parasitella (Hübner, 1796)
Trichophaga bipartitella (Ragonot, 1892)
Trichophaga tapetzella (Linnaeus, 1758)

Tischeriidae
Coptotriche angusticollella (Duponchel, 1843)
Coptotriche marginea (Haworth, 1828)
Tischeria ekebladella (Bjerkander, 1795)

Tortricidae
Acleris aspersana (Hübner, 1817)
Acleris bergmanniana (Linnaeus, 1758)
Acleris boscanoides Razowski, 1959
Acleris permutana (Duponchel, 1836)
Aethes bilbaensis (Rossler, 1877)
Aethes deaurana (Peyerimhoff, 1877)
Aethes nefandana (Kennel, 1899)
Aethes tesserana (Denis & Schiffermuller, 1775)
Aphelia unitana (Hübner, 1799)
Clepsis pallidana (Fabricius, 1776)
Cnephasia cupressivorana (Staudinger, 1871)
Cnephasia ecullyana Real, 1951
Cnephasia longana (Haworth, 1811)
Cnephasia incertana (Treitschke, 1835)
Cochylidia heydeniana (Herrich-Schäffer, 1851)
Cochylidia moguntiana (Rossler, 1864)
Cochylidia rupicola (Curtis, 1834)
Cochylimorpha elongana (Fischer v. Röslerstamm, 1839)
Cochylimorpha jucundana (Treitschke, 1835)
Cochylimorpha perfusana (Guenee, 1845)
Cochylis epilinana Duponchel, 1842
Cochylis hybridella (Hübner, 1813)
Cochylis molliculana Zeller, 1847
Cochylis nana (Haworth, 1811)
Cochylis roseana (Haworth, 1811)
Crocidosema plebejana Zeller, 1847
Cryptocochylis conjunctana (Mann, 1864)
Cydia pomonella (Linnaeus, 1758)
Diceratura roseofasciana (Mann, 1855)
Dichrorampha pastoralisi Razowksi & Tokar, 2003
Dichrorampha sequana (Hübner, 1799)
Epinotia dalmatana (Rebel, 1891)
Eucosma albuneana (Zeller, 1847)
Eucosma conformana (Mann, 1872)
Eucosma gradensis (Galvagni, 1909)
Eugnosta lathoniana (Hübner, 1800)
Exapate congelatella (Clerck, 1759)
Falseuncaria degreyana (McLachlan, 1869)
Gynnidomorpha rubricana (Peyerimhoff, 1877)
Hysterophora maculosana (Haworth, 1811)
Isotrias rectifasciana (Haworth, 1811)
Lobesia andereggiana (Herrich-Schäffer, 1851)
Neosphaleroptera nubilana (Hübner, 1799)
Pelochrista agrestana (Treitschke, 1830)
Pelochrista fusculana (Zeller, 1847)
Pelochrista latericiana (Rebel, 1919)
Pelochrista mollitana (Zeller, 1847)
Phalonidia affinitana (Douglas, 1846)
Phalonidia contractana (Zeller, 1847)
Phtheochroa duponchelana (Duponchel, 1843)
Phtheochroa fulvicinctana (Constant, 1893)
Phtheochroa inopiana (Haworth, 1811)
Phtheochroa pulvillana Herrich-Schäffer, 1851
Phtheochroa purana (Guenee, 1845)
Phtheochroa sodaliana (Haworth, 1811)
Prochlidonia amiantana (Hübner, 1799)
Rhyacionia hafneri (Rebel, 1937)

Yponomeutidae
Kessleria alpicella (Stainton, 1851)
Paradoxus osyridellus Stainton, 1869
Scythropia crataegella (Linnaeus, 1767)

Ypsolophidae
Ochsenheimeria taurella (Denis & Schiffermuller, 1775)
Ypsolopha albiramella (Mann, 1861)
Ypsolopha alpella (Denis & Schiffermuller, 1775)
Ypsolopha asperella (Linnaeus, 1761)
Ypsolopha dentella (Fabricius, 1775)
Ypsolopha instabilella (Mann, 1866)
Ypsolopha lucella (Fabricius, 1775)
Ypsolopha parenthesella (Linnaeus, 1761)
Ypsolopha persicella (Fabricius, 1787)
Ypsolopha scabrella (Linnaeus, 1761)
Ypsolopha sculpturella (Herrich-Schäffer, 1854)
Ypsolopha semitessella (Mann, 1861)
Ypsolopha sylvella (Linnaeus, 1767)
Ypsolopha trichonella (Mann, 1861)

Zygaenidae
Adscita geryon (Hübner, 1813)
Adscita statices (Linnaeus, 1758)
Adscita mannii (Lederer, 1853)
Jordanita chloros (Hübner, 1813)
Jordanita globulariae (Hübner, 1793)
Jordanita graeca (Jordan, 1907)
Jordanita subsolana (Staudinger, 1862)
Jordanita budensis (Ad. & Au. Speyer, 1858)
Jordanita notata (Zeller, 1847)
Rhagades pruni (Denis & Schiffermuller, 1775)
Theresimima ampellophaga (Bayle-Barelle, 1808)
Zygaena carniolica (Scopoli, 1763)
Zygaena brizae (Esper, 1800)
Zygaena cynarae (Esper, 1789)
Zygaena punctum Ochsenheimer, 1808
Zygaena purpuralis (Brunnich, 1763)
Zygaena angelicae Ochsenheimer, 1808
Zygaena ephialtes (Linnaeus, 1767)
Zygaena filipendulae (Linnaeus, 1758)
Zygaena lonicerae (Scheven, 1777)
Zygaena loti (Denis & Schiffermuller, 1775)
Zygaena osterodensis Reiss, 1921
Zygaena transalpina (Esper, 1780)
Zygaena viciae (Denis & Schiffermuller, 1775)

External links
Fauna Europaea

Croatia
Croatia
 Croatia
Lepidoptera